This is an alphabetical list of known Hindi songs performed, sung and/or recorded by Mohammed Rafi between 1942 and 1980. Over 5,000 of his songs are listed here. Mohammed Rafi also sang in several different languages other than Hindi such as Punjabi, Marathi etc. Some of which are also listed here.

T 

(316)
 "Jab Me Tere (Singer Vinod Meena/Raj Meena) Release Bay 2023 " Recoard Lebal:- Meena Song Entertaintment
 "Taalim Ka Tarana (Solo - Vasant Desai/S. R. Chopra) - Nai Taleem 1949"		
 "Taane Tandane Taane (Duet Asha Bhosle - Iqbal Qureshi/Rajendra Krishan) - Bindiya 1960"	
 "Taaqat Watan Ki Tum Se Hain, Himmat Watan Ki Tum Se Hain, Izzat Watan Ki Tum Se Hain, Insaan Ke Hum Rakhwale, ..Taaqat Watan Ki Hum Se Hain, Himmat Watan Ki Hum Se Hain, Izzat Watan Ki Hum Se Hain, Insaan Ke Hum Rakhwale (Patriotic Duet Manna Dey - S. D. Burman/Neeraj) - Prem Pujari 1970"
 "Taar Chokhey Naamey (Bengali Solo - Basu Manohari/Mukul Dutt) - Rafi ****"
 "Taare Kitne Neel Gagan Pe Taare Teri Umar Ho Itne Saal Jitne Neel Gagan Pe Taare (Munna Birthday Hemlata as Child - Laxmikant-Pyarelal/Anand Bakshi) - Aap Aye Bahaar Ayee 1971"      [Lu Lu Lu Lu La Lu Lu Lu Lu Lu La ...]
 "Taarif Karoon Kya Uski Jis Ne Tumhe Banaya (Solo - O. P. Nayyar) - Kashmir Ki Kali 1964"[Yeh Chand Ka Roshan Chehra Zulfon Ka Rang Sunehra Yeh Zeel Si Neeli Aankhen Koi Raaz Hain Inn Mein Gehra ...]
 "Taaron Bhari Raat Hain (Duet Suraiya - Ghulam Mohammad/Deena Nath Madhok-Shakeel Badayuni) - Kajal 1948"
 "Taaron Ka Yeh Khazana (Duet Shamshad Begum - Govind Ram/Majrooh Sultanpuri) - Nisbat 1949"
 "Taaron Ke Chhaon Mein (Duet Lata Mangeshkar - Ravi/Sahir Ludhianvi) - Samaaj Ko Badal Dalo 1970"
 "Taat Ka Parda (Duet Jagdeep - Dilip Sen-Sameer Sen/Jan Nisar Akhtar) - Soorma Bhopali 1988"
 "Tabiyat Saaf Ho Gai Saaf (Funny Multi Citalkar and Shamshad Begum - C. RamChandra/Rajendra Krishan) - Sagai 1951"      [Ek Din Lahore Ki Thundi Sadak Par Shaam Ko Ja Rahe The Cycle Par Hum Zaroori Kaam Par Aji Samne Se Aa Rahin Thi Bubulon Ki Toliyan Rok Kar Cycle Lage Hum Sun Ne Mithi Boliyan [Uth Jooti] ..Bigad Gai Ban Te Ban Te Baat Huyi Woh Jooton Ki Barsaat ...]
 "Tadap Tadap Jiyawa Dehiya Mein (Bhjpuri Solo - Babu Singh Maan/Madhukar) - Solaho Singar Kare Dulhniya 1965"
 "Tadapa Ke Woh Bhi Tadpe Hai Iss Ka Malal Hai (Qawali Asha Bhosle - Iqbal Gill) - **** 1989 and Kala Coat 1993"
 "Tadpa Ke Mujhe Ab Chhod Diya (Duet Lata Mangeshkar - C. Ramchandra/Gulshan Jalalabadi) - Namoona 1949" 
 "Taiyyab Ali Pyar Ka Dushman Haaye Haaye.. Meri Jaan Ka Dushman Haaye Haaye, Haaye Haaye, Ladka Aur Ladki Raazi, Phir Bhi Na Maane Kaazi,  Yeh Zid Na Chhode, Mere Dil Ko Tode, Yeh Ban Ne Na De, Meri Salama Ko Meri Dulhan  (Qawali Enuches - Laxmikant-Pyarelal/Anand Bakshi) - Amar Akbar Anthony 1977 and Evergreen Mohd Rafi ****"
 "Taj Tere Liye Ek (Solo - Madan Mohan Kohli/Sahir Ludhianvi) - Gazal 1964"
 "Takht Na Hoga Taj Na Hoga Kal Tha Lekin Aaj Na Hoga Jis Mein Sab Adhikar Na Paye Woh Sachcha Sauraj Na Hoga (Patriotic Multi Manna Dey and Geeta Dutt - Ravi Shankar Sharma / Sahir Ludhianvi) - Aaj Aur Kal II 1963"
 "Takra Gaya Tum Se Dil Hi To Hain, Roye Na Ye Kyun Ghayeel Bhi Ti Hain 1 (Solo - Naushad Ali/Shakeel Badayuni) - Aan I 1952"      [Humko Hua Tum Se Pyaar, Ab Hain Tumhein Ifteyaar, Chahe Bana Do Chahe Mita Do, ...]
 "Takra Gaya Tumse Dil Hee to Hai Roye Na Yeh Kyun Ghayal Hi To Hain 2 (Solo - Naushad Ali/Shakeel Badayuni) - Aan I 1952"      [Dil Ko Hua Tum Se Pyar, Aa Aa Ab Hai Tumhein Ikhtiyar Chahe Bana Do Chahe Mita Do  ...]
 "Talkhi E Mai Mein Zara Aa Aa Aa ..Talkhi E Dil Bhhi Ghoilein (Urdu Ghazal Solo - Taj Ahmad Khan/Krishan Adeeb) - Yaadgaar Ghazalein Vol. 1 **** and Rafi Aye Jaan E Ghazal **** or Ghazal Ka Safar and The Golden Moments - Mohammed Rafi - Kitni Rahat Hai 1999"
 "Tammanaon Ki Duniya Yun To Har Insaan Basata Hain Magar Paata Wohi Hain Jo Yanha Taqadir Lata Hain Mere Dost Tujhe Tera Meet Mubarak (Bidai - Ravi) - Dharkan 1972"
 "Tan Mein Agni Man Mein Chubhan Kaap Utha Mera Bheega Badan O Rubba Khair O Rubba Khair O Rubba Khair Khair (ChachaCha Duet Asha Bhosle - Shankar-Jaikishan/Hasrat Jaipuri) - Laat Saab or Saheb 1967"
 "Tan Phoonkta Hain Dil Jalta Hain (Solo - Hansraj Behl/A. Shah) - Raat Ki Rani 1949"
 "Tan Rang lo Ji Aaj Mann Rang Lo Khelo Khelo Umang Bhare Rang (Holi Duet Lata Mangeshkar - Naushad Ali/Shakeel Badayuni) - Kohinoor 1960"
 "Tana Dhere Tana Ji, Gaayein Dil Gana (Solo - N. Dutta aka Datta Naik/Tanveer Naqvi) - Miss '58 (Fifty Eight) 1958"
 "Tane Tandane Bhai Tandane Tane ..Gore Gore Haath Lage Tokri Oothane (Business Construction Asha Bhosle - Iqbal Qureshi) - Bindiya 1960"      [O O O O O O ...]
 "Tang Aa Chuke Hain Kasham Kashe Zindagi Se Hum Thukra Na De Jahaan Ko Hum DeDili Se Hum (Verse Solo - S. D. Burman/Sahir Ludhianvi) - Pyaasa 1957"
 "Tang Pochiya di Pake ..Dil lei Gayi Are Kuch Keh Gayi O O (Punjabi Shamshad Begum - Unknown) - Billo ****"
 "Taqdeer Ka Fasana, Taqdeer Ka Fasana, Ja Kar Kise Sunaye, Is Dil Mein Jal Rahin Hain Armaan Ki Chitayein 2 (Bidai Solo - Ramlal Heerapanna/Hasrat Jaipuri) - Sehra 1963 and Mohammed Rafi Collection Vol. 2 ****"
 "Taqdeer Kahan Le Jayegi Malum Nahin Lekin Hai Yakin Aayegi Manzil Aayegi Manzil (Outdoor Solo - Shankar-Jaikishan/Shailendra) - Sanjh Aur Savera 1964"
 "Taqdeer Ke Chakkar Mein (Solo - Ravi) - Nai Maa 1960
 "Taqdeer Ke Kalam Se Jo Likha (Solo - Laxmikant-Pyarelal/Verma Malik) - Bereham 1980"
 "Taqdeer Mein, Aye Mere Dil, Andhere Hi Andhere Hain, Nazar Aati Nahin Manzil (Solo - Ravindra Jain/Ravindra Jain) - Kaanch Aur Heera 1972"      [Nazar Aati Nahin Manzil, Tadapane Se Bhi Kya Haasil, ...]
 "Tara Ri Yara Ri Yara Ri Tara Ri Yara Ri Yara Ri (Yeh Sawan Rut Tum Aur Hum Tara Rum Tara Ra Rum) (Waltz Duet Suraiya - Naushad Ali/Shakeel Badayuni) - Dastan 1950" (Rafi Sings for Raj Kapoor)										
 "Taron Ki Chhaon Tale Shama Parwana Mile (Duet Suman Kalyanpur - S. Mohinder/Anand Bakshi) - Zarak Khan 1963"										
 "Taron Ki Zuban Par Hain, Mohobbat Ki Kahani, Aey Chaand Mubarak Ho, Tujhe Raat Suhani (Duet Lata Mangeshkar - C. RamChandra/Parwez Shamsi) - Nausherwan-E-ADil 1957"										
 "Tassavur Tera Ibaadat Hain (Solo - Naushad Ali/Khumar Barabankvi) - Love and God 1986"										
 "Tasveer Banata Hoon Teri Khoon-E-Jigar Se Khoon E Jigar Se (Solo - Naushad Ali/Shakeel Badayuni) - Diwana 1952"										
 "Tasveer Nayan Mein Thi Jin Ki (Duet Asha Bhosle - Chitragupt/Gopal Singh Nepali) - Raj Kanya 1955"										
 "Tasveer Teri Dil Mein, Jis Din Se Ootari Hain, Phiroon Tujhe Sang Le Ke, Naye Naye Rang Le Ke Sapanon Ki Mehfil Mein (Duet Lata Mangeshkar - Salil Chowdhary/Majrooh Sultanpuri) - Maya 1961"										
 "Tasveer Teri Dil Mera Behla Na Sakegi (Solo - Ravi/Raja Mehdi Ali Khan) - Devar Bhabhi 1958"										
 "Tasvoo Raat Ki Mehfil Saja Rahan Hoon Main ..Meri Nigaah Ne Yeh Kaisa Khwab Dekha Hain (Solo - Manas Mukherjee) - Lubna 1979"										
 "Tataiya Ne Dunk Mara (Duet Asha Bhosle - R. D. Burman/Majrooh Sultanpuri) - Jal Mahal 1980"										
 "Tauba Re Yeh Shararat Qurban Iss Ada Ke (Solo - G. S. Kohli) - Jung Aur Aman 1968"      [Haye Kya Shararat Hai Kya Ada Hai ...]										
 "Tauba Tauba Yeh Aadayein (Solo - S. Mohinder/Akhatar Romani) - Naya Paisa 1958"										
 "Tauba Yeh Adaayein Dekhe Se Khumaar Aaye Are Gora Tan Aisa Dilwalon Ko Pyar Aaye (Solo - R. D. Burman/Majrooh Sultanpuri or Jan Nisar Akhtar) - Ehsan 1970"      [Ha ...]										
 "Tauba Yeh Nazarein, Yeh Kaatil Isharein, Lut Gaye Ae Husn Walon, Hum Shaher Mein Tumharein, Tauba Yeh Nazarein, Yeh Kaatil Isharein, Lut Gaye Ae Husn Walon, Hum Shaher Mein Tumharein, Tauba Yeh Nazarein (Solo - Laxmikant-Pyarelal/Majrooh Sultanpuri) - Dillagi 1966"      [Hun Hun Hun ..Aa Ha Ha Aa ..O Ho Ho O ...]										
 "Tay Na Kar Paaye Jise Tu (Solo - B. S. Kalla/Pandit Indra) - Do Dulhe 1955" 										
 "Teen Batti Wala Govind Aala (Duet Kishore Kumar - Laxmikant-Pyarelal/Verma Malik) - Muqabla 1979"										
 "Teer Chala Ke Babu Jana Na Ho Babu Jana Na (Duet Asha Bhosle - Bipin Babul)- Shahi Mehmaan 1955"										
 "Teer Pe Teer Khaayein Ja (Solo - Khan Mastana-Nisar Bazmi/Khumar BaraBankvi) - Roop Lekha 1949"										
 "Tera Aana Bhi Dhokha Tha (Solo - N. Dutta aka Datta Naik/Rajendra Krishan) - Mere Apne Mere Sapne 1963"										
 "Tera Allah Beli 1 (Duet Chitragupt Shrivastava - Chitragupt) - SinBad Jahazi or The Sailor 1952"      [O Ho O O Saathi Utha BadBaan O Ho ...]										
 "Tera Allah Beli 2 (Duet Chitrigupta Shrivastava - Chitragupt) - Sinbad Jahazi or The Sailor 1952 (Mixed With Badbaan Song in The Movie)"      [Kabira Teri Zopadi ...]										
 "Tera Bhi Kisi Pe Dil Aaye Phir Koi Tujhe Bhi Tadpaye Allah Kare Allah Kare Allah Kare (Solo - Usha Khanna/Asad Bhopali) - Ek Sapera Ek Lutera 1965"										
 "Tera Chikna Roop Hain Aisa (Duet Asha Bhosle - Naushad Ali/Rajendra Krishan) - Ganwaar 1970"										
 "Tera Dil To Machalta Hoga (Duet Sulakshana Pandit - Laxmikant-Pyarelal) - Phaansi 1977"      [Jab Aati Hogi Yaad Meri Aey ...]										
 "Tera Husn Mana Badi Cheez Hain, Mera Dil Bhi Aakhir Koi Cheez Hain (Solo - Naushad Ali/Shakeel Badayuni) - Aan 1952" [Unreleased song]      [Sitamgar Dil Mein Tere Aag-E-Ulfat Ki Laga Doonga Kasam Teri Tujhe Main Pyar Karna Bhi Seekha Doonga ...]										
 "Tera Husn Rahe Mera Ishq Rahe (Solo - Hemant Kumar/Kaifi Azmi) - Do Dil 1965"										
 "Tera Jalwa Jis Ne Dekha (Duet S. D. Batish - Gobindram/Tanveer Naqvi) - Laila Majnu 1945"       [First Screen Appearance of Rafi]"										
 "Tera Jalwa Tauba Hain, Tera Jalwa, Jab Se Dekha Tauba Hain, Tera Jalwa, Ho O O Jee Chahe Jee Bhar Ke Taarif Karoo, O Kya Kehna Hain, Tera Jalwa (Happy Birthday Duet Kishore Kumar - Rajesh Roshan/Anand Bakshi) - Aap Ke Deewane 1980"										
 "Tera Jism Desh Da (Punjabi Patrotic Solo - Sapan Jagmohan/Naqsh Lyallpuri) - Udeekan ****"										
 "Tera Jo Hain Rasta Mera Wohi Rasta (Duet Asha Bhosle - Rajesh Roshan) - Shakka 1983"      [Sachchai Se Kahani Ka, Nayi Se Purani Ka, Diwane Se Jawani Ka Hain Kya Wasta, Tera Woh Rasta ..Sun Masre Ki Hoor Tera Nahin Hain Kasoor Jawani Ki Hain Guroor ..Zara Bol Asha ...]										
 "Tera Jogi Aaya (Duet Pankaj Mitra - Sapan-Jagmohan/M. G. Hashmat) - Mera Jeevan 1976"										
 "Tera Kaam Hain Jalna Parwane Chahe Shama Jale Ya Na Jale (Solo - S. Mohinder/Rajendra Krishan) - Paapi (Papi) 1953"  Rafi Sings for Raj Kapoor)									
 "Tera Khilona Toota Balak, Tera Khilona Toota, Tera Khilona Toota Balak, Tera Khilona Toota, Hain Kismat Ne Luta Tujh Ko, Hain Kismat Ne Luta, Tera Khilona Toota (Solo - Naushad Ali/Tanveer Naqvi) - Anmol Ghadi 1946"      (Rafi was first noted by Naushad Ali as a playback singer as opposed to chorus singer with this song)										
 "Tera Latka Raha Hain Latka (Duet Asha Bhosle - Ravi/Rajendra Krishan) - Ghar Ki Laaj 1960"										
 "Tera Mera Ho Gaya Prem, Main Hoon Sahab Main Hoon Mem (Duet Shamshad Begum - Husnlal-Bhagatram/Qamar Jalalabadi) - Farmaaish 1953"										
 "Tera Mera Manwa Kaise (Solo - J. P. Kaushik/Kabir) - Aankhin Dekhi 1978"										
 "Tera Mera Mera Tera Pyar Ho Pyari (Duet Sulochana Kadam - Sonik/Shyam Hindi) - Mamta 1952"										
 "Tera Mera Yaranay (Duet Lata Mangeshkar - Laxmikant-Pyarelal/Verma Malik) - Nagin 1976"										
 "Tera Muskurana (Duet Suman Kalyanpur - Nashad Ali/Sarvar) - Pyar Ki Dastaan 1961"       (Nashad Ali was also known as Shaukat Ali, Shaukat Haidari, Shaukat Dehlvi, Shaukat Husain and Shaukat Husain Haidari.) 										
 "Tera Naam Liya Dil Tham Liya (Qawali Asha Bhosle - Naushad Ali/Majrooh Sultanpuri) - Dharam Kanta 1982"      [Aa Aa Aa ..Dil Ke Bazar Mein, Daulat Nahin Bechi Jaati, Pyar Ho Jaye To Surat Nahin Dekhi Jaati, Aa Aa Aa ..Ek Aada Par Yeh Dil-O-Jaan Nichawar Kar Loon, Maal Accha Ho To Kimat Nahin Dekhi JAati, ..Ulfat Ko Zamana Kya Jane Aa Aa Aa Ulfat Se Hum Ne Kaam Liya ...]										
 "Tera Naam Mera Naam, Laakh Mitaye Koi Mitna Sakega Teranaam Mera Naam (Duet Asha Bhosle - Iqbal Qureshi/Qamar Jalalabadi) - Yeh Dil Kis Ko Doon 1963"      [Jab Tak Duniya Rahin, Rahega Tera Naam Mera Naam, ...]										
 "Tera Noor Sitaron Mein Tera Rang Baharon Mein ..Mee Rakasam Mee Rakasam 1 (Duet Chandrashekhar Gadgil - R. D. Burman) - Harjaee 1980"										
 "Tera Noor Sitaron Mein Tera Rang Baharon Mein ..Mee Rakasam Mee Rakasam 2 (Duet Chandrashekhar Gadgil - R. D. Burman) - Harjaee 1980"										
 "Tera Pyaar Khuda (Duet Manna Dey - Sonik-Omi/M. G. Hashmat) - Do Chattaane 1974"										
 "Tera Rang Bada Hain Gora (Solo - Ravindra Jain/Dev Kohli) - Aakhri Kasam 1978"										
 "Tera Sheeshe Ka Saaman, Maine Toda Meri Jaan, Tera Sheeshe Ka Saaman, Maine Toda Meri Jaan, To Kya Hua, To Kya Hua, Tere Rehne Ke Liye Main Shish-Mahal Banawaoonga, Shish-Mahal Kya Karna Hain, Shish-Mahal Kya Karna Hain, Achha Hain Mera Jhopada, La Rakh De Mera Rokda (Business Duet Lata Mangeshkar - Laxmikant-Pyarelal) - Chacha Bhatija 1977 and Evergreen Mohd Rafi ****"										
 "Tera Woh Rasta Mera Woh Rasta (Duet Asha Bhosle - Rajesh Roshan/Verma Malik) - Shakka 1981"										
 "Tere Aage Bolna Dushwar Ho Gaya (Solo - O. P. Nayyar/Majrooh Sultanpuri) - Hum Sab Chor Hain 1956"										
 "Tere Aane Ki Aas Hai Dost ..Tu Kahin (Last Solo - Laxmikant-Pyarelal) - Aas Pas 1980"										
 "Tere Andron Mail Na Jaye (Punjabi Minoo Purushattam - Hansraj Behl) - Morni 1975"										
 "Tere Bharose Nandlal (Non-filmy Bhajan Solo - Unknown/Unknown) - Tere Bharose Nandlal 1991 and This Is Mohd Rafi Saab -Ghazala And Bhajans ****"										
 "Tere Bin Sajan Lage Na Jiya Humar, Tere Bin Sajan Lage Na Jiya Humar, ..Chhup Chhup Ke Karta Hain Ishare Chanda Sau Sau Baar, ..Kya ..Aa Tohe Sajani, Le Chaloon Nadiyan Ke Paar, Tere Bin Sajan Lage Na Jiya Humar (Duet Lata Mangeshkar - Roshan Lal/Majrooh Sultanpuri) - Aarti II 1962"      [Ae Hey Baar Baar Tohe Kya Samajhayein Payal Ki Jhankaa-a-a-r, Ho O O, ..Ae Hey Baar Baar, Tohe Kya, Samajhayein, Mere, Payal Ki Jhankaar, ..Baar Baar, Tohe Kya Samajhayein, Baar Baar, Tohe Kya Samajhayein, Payal Ki Jhankaar, ..Kya ...]										
 "Tere Bin Soone Nain Humarein, Tere Bin Sune, BAat Takat Gaye SAanjh Sakale, Tere Bin Sune (Duet Lata Mangeshkar - S. D. Burman/Shailendra) - Meri Surat Teri Ankhen 1963"      [Aa Aa Aa ...]
 "Tere Chahne Wale Aaye Hain (Qawali  Multi Asha Bhosle, Hemlata and Bhushan Mehta - Shankar-Jaikishan/Rajendra Krishan) - Chhote Sarkaar 1974"....[Kahin Naam Na Apna Likh Dena....]										
 "Tere Chehere Mein Jo Hain Baat (Solo - Shankar-Jaikishan/Rajendra Krishan) - Chhote Sarkaar 1974"										
 "Tere Chehre Se Hate Ankh (Solo - Chitragupt/Rajendra Krishan) - Pyar Ka Sapna 1969"										
 "Tere Chehre Se Parda Hatana Hain (Duet Kishore Kumar - Rajesh Roshan/Anjan) - Muqaddar 1978"										
 "Tere Dar Pe Aaya Hoon, Kuchh Kar Ke Jaoonga, Jholi Bhar Ke Jaoonga, Yaa Mar Ke Jaoonga (Prayer Solo - Madan Mohan Kohli/Sahir Ludhianvi) - Laila Majnu 1976 and Mohammed Rafi Collection Vol. & ****"										
 "Tere Dil Ka Makaan, Saiyan Bada Aalishan, Bolo Bolo Meri Jaan, Hain Kiraaya Kitna, Khali Dil Ka Makaan, Ban Ke Aaja Mehmaan, Aey Na Poochho Meri Jaan, Hain Kiraaya Kitna (Duet Asha Bhosle - O. P. Nayyar/Qamar Jalalabadi) - Do Ustad 1959"  (Rafi Sings for Raj Kapoor)										
 "Tere Dil Ki Dhadkane Mere Dil Mein Aaye Baat Bane Ya Na Bane Pyar To Nibhaye (Duet Asha Bhosle - Gulshan Sufi/Kaif) - Ghamand 1955"										
 "Tere Dil Mein Zara Si Jagah (Duet Lata Mangeshkar - Laxmikant-Pyarelal/Majrooh Sultanpuri) - Anokhi Ada II 1973"										
 "Tere Gesuon Ka Saaya (Solo - O. P. Nayyar/Aziz Kashmiri) - Love & Murder 1966"										
 "Tere Ghar Ke Dar-O-Deewar Se (Solo - Kamal Rajasthani/Mehboob Sarwar) - Mere Gharib Nawaaz 1973"										
 "Tere Ghoongru Jo Cham Cham Baaje (Duet Asha Bhosle - S. Mohinder/Raja Mehdi Ali Khan) - Naya Paisa 1958"										
 "Tere Haathon Mein Jeevan Ki Jeet Haar 1 (Duet Geeta Roy aka Geeta Dutt - Mohan junior/Kaif Irfani) - Dana Pani 1953"										
 "Tere Haathon Mein Pehnake Choodiyaan (Qawali Duet Asha Bhosle - Laxmikant-Pyarelal/Verma Malik) - Jaani Dushman 1979"										
 "Tere Hathon Mein Apni II (Solo - Hansraj Behl/Prem Warbartani) - Ek Din Ka Badshah 1964"										
 "Tere Hum O Sanam (Duet Suman Kalyanpur - Sardar Malik/Hasrat Jaipuri) - Bachpan 1963"										
 "Tere Husn Ki Kya Tareef Karoon Kuch Kehte Huye Bhi Darata Hoon (Duet Lata Mangeshkar - Naushad Ali/Shakeel Badayuni) - Leader 1964"										
 "Tere Is Pyar Ka Shukriya, Mere Meharbaan, Tere Is Pyar Ka Shukriya, Mere Meharbaan, Mere Meharbaan, Mere Meharbaan (Piano Solo - N. Dutta/Datta Naik/Shamshul Huda Bihari) - Aag Aur Daag 1971"      [Aaj Inn Haathon Mein Phir Se, Zindagi Hain Saaz Hain, Kya Kahoon Ae Husn Tujh Par, Kitna Mujh Ko Naaz Hain, ...]										
 "Tere Ishq Ka Mujh Pe Hua Yeh Asar Hain (Duet Asha Bhosle - Laxmikant-Pyarelal/Verma Malik) - Nagin 1976"										
 "Tere Jaisa Bhai Sab Ko Milein 1 (Duet Kishore Kumar - Rajesh Roshan/Gulshan Bawra) - Duniya Meri Jeb Mein 1979"										
 "Tere Jaisa Bhai Sab Ko Milein 2 (Duet Kishore Kumar - Rajesh Roshan/Gulshan Bawra) - Duniya Meri Jeb Mein 1979"										
 "Tere Jaisa Kaun Hain Tere Jaisa Koi Nahin Kaise Kaise Phool Chaman Mein Lekin Aisa Kaun Hain (Waltz Solo - Kalyanji-Anandji/Anand Bakshi) - Tamanna 1969"										
 "Tere Karam Ki Dhoom (Duet Jaani Babu Qawwal - G. S. Kohli/Unknown) - Char Darvesh 1964"										
 "Tere Kooche Mein Armaan Ki Duniya Le Aaya Hoon (Solo - Naushad Ali/Shakeel Badayuni) - Dillagi 1949"      [O O O O O O ...]										
 "Tere Kooche Mein Tera Diwana Aaj Dil Kho Baitha (Solo - Madan Mohan Kohli/Kaifi Azmi) - Heer Ranjha 1970"      [O O O O O O ...]										
 "Tere Laung Da ..Shehar Mein Charcha (Duet Lata Mangeshkar - Laxmikant-Pyarelal) - Aas Pas 1980"										
 "Tere Mere Sapne Ab Ek Rang Hain O O O~o~o Jahan Bhi Le Jaye Raahein Hum Sang Hain (Solo - S. D. Burman/Shailendra) - Guide 1965"										
 "Tere Mukhde Ka Til Kaala Kaala (Duet Lata Mangeshkar - Madan Mohan Kohli/Rajendra Krishan) - Minister 1959"										
 "Tere Naam Ka Diwana Tere Ghar Ko Dhoodhta Hain Jis Nazar Pe Phir Fida Hain Us Nazar Ko Dhoodhata Hain (Solo - Laxmikant-Pyarelal/Anand Bakshi) - Suraj Aur Chanda 1973"										
 "Tere Nain Mere Nain Dekhte Rahein, Tere Nain Mere Nain Dekhte Rahein, Baaton Batto Mein Na Jane Kya Hua,  Tere Nain Mere Nain Dekhte Rahein, Tere Nain Mere Nain Dekhte Rahein (Duet Lata Mangeshkar - Kalyanji-Anandji/Rajendra Krishan) - Rakhwala 1971"      [Rok Lo, Apni Mast Angadai, Dono Aalm Na, Toot Jaye Kahin, Aasman Ke Haseen, Haathon Se, Chand Suraj Na, Chhoot Jaye Kahin ..Dil Ne Dil Se Na Jane Kya Kahan Aa O ...] 										
 "Tere Nain Nashe De Pyale Inhe Piyenge Naseebon Wale (Classical Solo - Laxmikant-Pyarelal/Anand Bakshi) - Gora Aur Kala 1972"										
 "Tere Nainon Ke Main Deep Jalaoonga Apni Aankhon Se Duniya Dikhlaoonga (Duet Lata Mangeshkar - S. D. Burman/Anand Bakshi) - Anuraag II 1972"										
 "Tere Nainon Ne Jadoo Dala Dil Loot Liya Matwala (Horse-Cart Lata Mangeshkar - Salil Chowdhury/Prem Dhawan) - Tangawali 1955"										
 "Tere Nakhare Mein Garam Masala (Duet Krishna Kalle - Shyamji Ghanshyamji/Kulwant Jaani) - Gaal Gulabi Nain Sharabi 1974"      [Oye Oye Gaal Gulabi Nain Sharabi Chaal Nashili Umar Shababi Keh Magar Dilwala ...]										
 "Tere Nazdeek Jaate Hain, Na Tujh Se Hain Na, Tujh Se Door Hote Hain (Duet Ameerbai Karnataki - Ameerbai Karnataki/Akhtar Pilibhiti) - Shahnaz 1948"  										
 "Tere Paas Aa Ke Mere Waqt Guzar Jata (Duet Asha Bhosle - Madan Mohan Kohli/Raja Mehdi Ali Khan) - Neela Akash 1965"										
 "Tere Peechhe Phirte Phirte Ho Gaya Pura Saal (Duet Suman Kalyanpur - Hansraj Behl/Prem Dhawan) - Mud Mud Ke Na Dekh 1960"										
 "Tere Pujan Ko Bhagwan Banaoon, Bank Main Aalishan (Prayer - Chitragupt) - Shadi 1961"      [(Puja Bell Sound) Teri Sharan Pada Hoon Data, Tu Hi Pita Hain Tu Hi Mata, Hum Sab Tere Bachhe Balein, Tu Sari Duniya Ko Palein, Das Bhagat Ka Hain Yeh Kehna, Darshan Nit Din Dete Rehna ...]										
 "Tere Pyar Ne Mujhe Gham Diya (Solo - Laxmikant-Pyarelal/Asad Bhopali) - Chhaila Babu 1967"										
 "Tere Pyar Ne Yeh Kam Kiya Mere Roop Ko Badnam Kiya (Duet Lata Mangeshkar - Laxmikant Pyrelal/Anand Bakshi) - Maa Aur Mamta 1970"      [O Ho O Aa Aa Aa O O O Haaye ..Tere Roop Ne Yeh Kaam Kiya ...]
 "Tere Sadke Mila De Mera Yaar Upar Wale (Duet Asha Bhosle - Ravi/S. H. Bihari) - Apna Banake Dekho 1962"									
 "Tere Sang Jeena, Tere Sang Marna, Ab Roothe Ya Jag Chhote Hum Ko Kya Darna (Duet Lata Mangeshkar - Laxmikant-Pyrelal/Majrooh Sultanpuri) - Naach Uthe Sansaar 1976"       [Aa Aa Aa ...]										
 "Tere Shehron Se Raja Humein Ban Hi Bhale (Duet Lata Mangeshkar - N. Dutta aka Datta Naik/Sahir Ludhianvi) - Naach Ghar 1959"										
 "Tere Shishe Ka Samaan (Duet Lata mangeshkar - Laxmikant-Pyarelal/Anand Bakshi) - Chacha Bhatija 1977"										
 "Teri Aankhon Ke Siva Duniya Mein Rakkha (Solo - Madan Mohan Kohli/Majrooh Sultanpuri) - Chirag 1969 and Mohammed Rafi Collection Vol. 7 ****"										
 "Teri Aawaz Ki Jadugari Se Na Jane Kis Jahaan Mein Kho Gaya Hoon (Solo - Sapan-Jagmohan/Prem Warbartani) - Teri Talaash Mein 1968"										
 "Teri Ada (An Audio Documentary including streams  of Rafi-Asha-Chitragupa/Kafil Azar songs) - Mohammed Rafi: The Last Songs 2010"      (Planned Hindi remake of a 1962 Bengali film with the name, "Sorry Madam" by Dilip Bose was never made, because it may have been considered as bad luck due to loss of Dilip Bose's wife and financial hardship.  The music, however, was recorded just seven months before Rafi's death.  The music was restored by Frenchman Achille Forler of a music publishing company, Deep Emotions in a joint venture with Universal Music.   Forler sent the tapes to Equus Studios in Belgium to restore and released the album in 11-2-2010 by Silk Road Communications with an additional Track "Teri Ada", which gives audio documentary from Dilip Bose's sons Bobby [and may be Rajesh] and Chitragupt's sons Anand-Milind.  Asha Bhosle's Solo is Hole Re Dole Re.  Forler told Deccan Herald that he was prepared to do shirshasana for one year to have a Rafi album in his catalogue—the catalogue # is SR025 and the file is under Hindi Memorabilia. )										
 "Teri Ada Kuchh Aur Hain (Duet Asha Bhosle - R. D. Burman/Majrooh Sultanpuri) - Naukar 1979"										
 "Teri Allah Karein Rakhawali (Prayer Solo - Husnalal Bhagatram/Qamar Jalalabadi) - Adil-E-Jahangir 1954"      [Allah, Aa Aa Aa Aa ...]										
 "Teri Ankh Ka Jo Ishara Na Hota To Bismil Kabhi Dil Humara Na Hota (Solo - Ravi/Rajendra Krishan) - Nai Roshni 1967"										
 "Teri Ankhon Ka Rang Nirala Hain (Duet Lata Mangeshkar - Khayyam/Hasrat Jaipuri) - Barood 1960"										
 "Teri Ankhon Main Pyar (Duet Lata Mangeshkar - Chitragupt/Prem Dhawan) - Chand Mere Aaja 1960"										
 "Teri Ankhon Mein Pyar Maine Dekh Liya Gori Tu Laakh Chhupao Tu Bhi Hain Beqaraar Maine Dekh Liye Saiyan Na Baat Banao (Duet Lata Mangeshkar - Chitragupt) - Chand Mere Aaja 1960"      [O O O O O O ..Aa Aa Aa ...]										
 "Teri Azadi Di Shamna (Punjabi Patriotic Solo - Sapan Jagmohan/Naqsh Lyallpuri) - Udeekan ****"										
 "Teri Bindiya Re Haaye Haaye Teri Bindiya Re Sajan Bindiya Le Legi Teri Nindiya (Duet Lata Mangeshkar - S. D. Burman/Majrooh Sultanpuri) - Abhimaan 1973"      [Hun Hun Hun ..O O O ...]										
 "Teri Chaal Atpat Naina Natkhat (Solo - Sushant Bannerjee/Madhur) - Ghar Grihasthi 1958"										
 "Teri Chahat Mein Jiye (Multi Asha Bhosle and Usha Mangeshkar - Sajjad/Shakeel Nomani) - Mera Shikar 1973"										
 "Teri Dhoom Har Kahin, Tujh Sa Yaar Koi Nahin, Hum Ko To Pyare Tu Sab Se Pyara, Lai Lai Lai Teri Dhun (Solo - S. D. Burman/Shailendra) - Kala Bazar 1960"      [Suraj Ke Jaise Dhulai, Chanda Si Thandak Bhi Payi, Khan Ke To Pyare Duhai (Money Sound) ...]										
 "Teri Duniya Mein Aakar (Duet Geeta Dutt - Avinash Vyas/Bharat Vyas) - Aadhi Roti 1957" 										
 "Teri Duniya Se Door Chale Ho Ke Majboor Humein Yaad Rakhana (Duet Lata Mangeshkar - Chitragupt/Prem Dhawan) - Zabak 1961"										
 "Teri Galiyon Mein Na Rakhenge Kadam Aaj Ke Baad Tere Milne Ko Na Aayenge Sanam Aaj Ke Baad (Bidai Solo - Usha Khanna/Saawan Kumar Tak) - Hawas 1974 and Mohammed Rafi Collection Vol. 3 ****"										
 "Teri Gul Da (Punjabi Duet Minoo Purshottam - Surinder Kohli/Ajit Kamal) - Batwara Film Hits ****"										
 "Teri Haseen Nigah (Duet Lata Mangeshkar - Laxmikant-Pyarelal/Anand Bakshi) - Devi 1970"										
 "Teri Jawani Tapta Mahina Aey Najanina (Solo - Ravi/Sahir Ludhianvi) - Amaanat I 1975"										
 "Teri Jyot Jale Subah Shaam Meri Maa Paawan Hain Tera Naam Meri Maa (Prayer Manhar Udhas and Kanchan - Kamalkant/Naqsh Lyallpuri) - Jai Jwala 1972"										
 "Teri Kanak Di Rakhi Mundia (Punjabi Duet Shamshad Begum - Hansraj Behl/Verma Malik) - Teri Kanak Di Rakhi **** and Jatta Aai Visakhi Vol. 1 ****"										
 "Teri Kasam Ho Dilruba (Duet Suman Kalyanpur - Nisar Bazmi/Saba Afghani) - Shola Jo Bhadke 1961"										
 "Teri Khushi Ke Tasvoor Mein Meri Khushi Kya Hain (Qawali Solo - Roshan Lal/) - Do Roti 1957"  [Udhar Bhi Husn Ki Chadar ...] 										
 "Teri Laila Ban Ke Teri Heer Ban Ke, Rani Tera Rahoonga Main Raja Ban Ke Tera Majnu Ban Ke Tera Raanza Ban Ke (Engagement Asha Bhosle and Usha Mangeshkar - Sudhir Sen/Kaifi Azmi) - Mangetar 1972"      [Tere Aankhon Mein Rahoongi Tasveer Ban Ke ...]										
 "Teri Mast Nigahon Ne Banaya (Duet Asha Bhosle - Bulo C. Rani/Indeevar) - Magic Box 1963"										
 "Teri Meharbani Hogi (Duet Asha Bhosle - N. Dutta aka Datta Naik/Asad Bhopali) - Raaka 1965"										
 "Teri Mehfil Mein Aaye Hain (Multi Asha Bhosle and Usha Mangeshkar - Sajjad/Shakeel Nomani) - Mera Shikar 1973"										
 "Teri Mehfil Mein Dil Thame (Solo - Ghulam Mohammad/Umar Ansari) - Sheesha 1952"										
 "Teri Mehfil Tera Jalwa Ter Surat Dekh Li Meri Aankho Ne Issi Duniya Mein Jannat Dekh Li (Solo - Naushad Ali/Shakeel Badayuni) - Sohni Mahiwal 1958"      [Aa Aa Aa .. Meri Aankhon Ne Isi Duniya Mein Jannat Dekh Li ...]										
 "Teri Meri Ek Marzi (Solo - Chitragupta/Bharat Vyas) - Baalak Aur Jaanwar 1975"										
 "Teri Meri Mohobbat Bhi Ek Amar Kahani Hain 2 (Duet Asha Bhosle - Sonik-Omi/Verma Malik) - Khoon Ki Takkar 1981"      [Aa Aa Aa ...]										
 "Teri Nazar Ki Chaabi Ne Khola (Solo - Nirmal Kumar/Anand Bakshi) - Lal Nishan 1959"										
 "Teri Nazar Mein Main Rahoon (Duet Geeta Dutt - Chitragupt/Prem Dhawan) - Band Master 1963"										
 "Teri Nazar Ne (Duet Asha Bhosle - G. S. Kohli/Farooq Qaiser) - Jaalsaaz 1969"										
 "Teri Nazar Ne Mara (Duet Asha Bhosle - Suresh Talwar/Jeet) - Saahil 1959"										
 "Teri Nazar Teri Adda (Solo - Chitragupa/Kafil Azar) - Mohammed Rafi: The Last Songs"      (see note under "Teri Ada")								
 "Teri Nazaron Ne Aisa Kata (Solo - Dattaram Wadkar/Gulshan Bawra) - Neeli Ankhen 1962"										
 "Teri Neeli Neeli Aankhon Ke, Dil Pe Teer Chal Gaye, Chal Gaye, Chal Gaye, Chal Gaye, Teri Neeli Neeli Aankhon Ke, Dil Pe Teer Chal Gaye, Chal Gaye, Chal Gaye, Chal Gaye, ..Yeh Dekh Ke Duniyawalon Ke, Dil Jal Gaye, Dil Gaye, Dil Gaye, Teri Neeli Neeli Aankhon Ke, Dil Pe Teer Chal Gaye, Chal Gaye, Chal Gaye (Duet Lata Mangeshkar - Shankar-Jaikishan) - Jaane Anjaane 1971"										
 "Teri Neeli Neeli Jacket (Duet Asha Bhosle - O. P. Nayyar/Farooq Qaiser) - Taxi Driver 1973"										
 "Teri Palkon Mein ..Kaajal Aey Haseena Hum Se Behtar Hai (Duet Suman Kalyanpur - Rajesh Roshan/Majrooh Sultanpuri) - Jai Vijay 1977"										
 "Teri Pasand Kya Hain (Solo - Hansraj Behl/Prem Warbartani) - Ek Din Ka Badshah 1964"										
 "Teri Patli Kamar (Duet Asha Bhosle - Ravi/Ravi) - Dus Lakh 1966"										
 "Teri Pyari Pyari Surat Ko Kisi Ki Nazar Na Lage Chashme-Baddhoo Mukhade Ko Chhupa Lo Aankhon Mein Kahin Meri Nazar Na Lage (Solo - Shankar-Jaikishan/Hasrat Jaipuri) - Sasural 1961"  (Rafi was again the back-to-back 1961 Filmfare Award Winning Singer)										
 "Teri Rab Ne Bana Di Jodi (Multi Asha Bhosle and Shailendra Singh - Laxmikant-Pyarelal/Anand Bakshi) - Suhaag 1979"										
 "Teri Reshmi Zulfein Chhoo Kar, Jab WAadein Shaba Aa Aati Hain, Har SAans Mahek JAati Hain, Har SAans Mahek JAati Hain, Tere PyAar Se Aye Mere HumDum, Khooshboo-E-Wafa Aa Aati Hain, Har SAans Mahek JAati Hain, Har SAans Mahek JAati Hain (HorseCart Lata Mangeshkar - Usha Khanna) - Aag 1967"      [Aa Aa Aa ...]										
 "Teri Sanson Mein, Kaisi Khooshboo Hain, Ab To Hum Se Raha Bhi Na Jaayein, Teri Aankhon Mein, Kaisa Jadu Hain, Ab To Humein Raha Bhi Na Jaayein (Duet Asha Bhosle - Sapan-Jagmohan/Gauhar Kanpuri) - Shaadi Se Pahle 1980"										
 "Teri Sharan Pada Hua Data (Prayer Solo - Chitragupt/Rajendra Krishan) - Shaadi 1962"										
 "Teri Shehnai Bole Sun Ke Dil Mera Dole Julmi Kahe Ko Sunaye Aaisi Taan Re Badal Ghir Ghir Aaye Papi Papihara Gaye Kaise Bas Mein Rahin Meri Jaan Re Aa aa aa Aa Aa (Duet Lata Mangeshkar - Vasant Desai/Bharat Vyas) - Goonj Uthi Shehnai 1959"      [O O O O O O ...]										
 "Teri Surat Se Nahin Milti Kisi Ki Surat (Solo - S. D. Burman/Hasrat Jaipuri) - Ziddi 1964"										
 "Teri Taareef Kya Karoon (Solo - Shankar Jaikishan/Hasrat Jaipuri) - Brahmachari 1968"										
 "Teri Taqdeer Ka Sitara (Multi S. Balbir and Geeta Dutt - Chitragupt/Prem Dhawan) - Zabak 1961"      [Bol Meri Ja Tu Kaun Hai ..Pari ...]										
 "Teri Tasveer Bhi Tujh Jaisi Haseen Hain Lekin, Is Pe Kurban Meri Jaan-E-Fasee Hain Lekin, Yeh Meri Zakhmo Umango Ka Majawa To Nahin (Solo - JaiDev/Nyay Sharma) - Kinare Kinare 1963"										
 "Teri Tasveer Se Ankhein Meri (Duet Asha Bhosle - Usha Khanna/Deena Nath Madhok) - Samay Bada Balwaan 1969"										
 "Teri Teer E Nazar Ka Balam, Dil Nishana Hua (Cha-Cha-Cha Duet Asha Bhosle - O. P. Nayyar/Majrooh Sultanpuri) - Bhagam Bhag 1956"										
 "Teri Tirchi Nazar Teri Patli Kamar (Duet Shamshad Begum - Chitragupt/Bharat Vyas) - Hamara Ghar 1950"										
 "Teri To Chand Sitaron Mein Baat Hoti Hain Chaman Chaman Mein Baharon Mein Baat Hoti Hain (Urdu Ghazal Solo - Iqbal or Ananda Shankar and Reminder Kaushal/Muzaffar Shahjahanpuri) - Ghazals - Mohammed Rafi By SAREGAMA ****"      [Aa Aa Aa ...]										
 "Teri Yaad Aa Rahin Hain (Duet Asha Bhosle - Ghulam Mohammad/Shakeel Badayuni) - Hazaar Raatein 1953"										
 "Teri Yaad Ki Gaaun Sargam (Solo - Shanti Kumar Desai/Madhur) - Tere Dwar Khade Bhagwan 1964"										
 "Teri Yaad Ne Bahut Satataya (Solo - Unknown/Unknown) - Unknown ****"      (May Be Punjabi Film) 										
 "Teri Yaad Sattayein Ghadi Ghadi (Solo - Husnlal-Bhagatram/Mulkraj Bhakri) - Bansaria 1949"										
 "Teri Zulfein Pareshaan Teri Nazarein Pashemaan Kahin Yeh Pyar Hi Na Ho Naseeb-E-Dushmana (Solo - Kalayanji Anandji/Anand Bakshi) - Preet Na Jane Reet 1964"										
 "Teri Zulfon Ke Saayein Mein (Duet Asha Bhosle - Vinod-S. Mohinder/Majrooh Sultanpuri) - Ek Ladki Saath Ladke 1961"										
 "Teri Zulfon Se Judai (Solo - Shankar Jaikishan/Hasrat Jaipuri) - Jab Pyar Kisi Se Hota Hai 1961 and Mohammed Rafi Collection Vol. 1 ****"										
 "Thaiya Chala Jaaye Raat Din Jeevan Ka Ghoda (Solo - Anil Biswas/Prem Dhawan) - Chaand 1956" 										
 "Thakur Tum Saranai Aaya Tum Sarnai Aaya (Punjabi Solo Prayer - S. Mohinder/Shabad Gurbani) - Shabad Devotional Songs **** and Shabad and Devotional Songs of Mohd. Rafi 2004"										
 "Thandi Hawayein Kaali Ghatayein (Duet Shamshad Begum - Ghulam Mohammad/Shakeel Badayuni) - Sitara 1955"										
 "Thane Meli Musugu (Telugu P. Susheela - C. RamChandran) - Akbar Saleem Anarkali ****"										
 "Thap Thup Thip Ki Taal Pe Mera Ghoda Chaal Dikhaye Lipat Lipat Kar Tange Ke Sang Raah Gujrati Jaye (Horse-Cart Solo - Naushad Ali/Majrooh Sultanpuri) - Tangewala 1972"										
 "Tharalenthaga Merisenu (Telugu - C. RamChandran) - Akbar Saleem Anarkali ****"										
 "Thehar Zara O Jaaneman (Duet Usha Khanna - Usha Khanna/Saawan Kumar Tak) - Ladki Bholi Bhali 1976"										
 "Thehriyein Hosh Mein Aa Loon To Chale Jayiyega Hun Hun Aap Ko Dil Mein Bitha Loon To Chale Jayige Hun Hun (Duet Suman Kalyanpur - Khayyam/Majrooh Sultanpuri) - Mohabbat Isko Kahte Hain 1965"										
 "Thoda Ruk Jayegi to Tera Kya Jayega, Nain Bhar Ke Dekh Lenge Chain Aa Jayega, O Kamani (Twist Solo - Shankar-Jaikishan/Indeevar) - Patangaa 1971 and Mohammed Rafi Collection Vol. 4 ****"										
 "Thoda Sa Dil Laga Ke Dekh (Duet Shamshad Begum - O. P. Nayyar/Majrooh Sultanpuri) - MusafirKhana 1955"										
 "Thoda Sa Hum Ko Sharbatein Deedar (Solo - Sudipt/Roopbani) - Ghulam Begum Badshah 1956"										
 "Thodi Thodi Gori Hain (Duet Geeta Dutt - Sardar Malik/ Prem Dhawan) - Superman 1960"										
 "Thukra Ke Humein Chal Diye Begana Samajhke (Solo - Husnlal-Bhagatram/Qamar Jalalabadi) - Balam 1949"										
 "Thumak Thumak Chaal Chale Aankh Mein Kajal Ki Dori (Duet Usha Mangeshkar - Shyamji Ghanshyamji/Gulshan Bawra) - Dhoti Lota Aur Chowpatty 1975"      [O O O O O O ...]										
 "Thumak Thumak Chali Hain (Solo - S. D. Burman/Kaifi Azmi) - Ek Ke Baad Ek 1960"										
 "Thumak Thumak Teri Chaal Masatni Main Ne Sapano Mein Dekhi Roop Ke Rani (Solo - Sonik-Omi/qamar Jalalabadi) - Mahua 1969"      [Tera Rang Sunehara O Kajara Gehra Gehra ...]										
 "Thumak, Thumak Thumak Thumak Haye Chali Hai Tu Kidhar (Solo - S. D. Burman) - Ek Ke Baad Ek 1959"       [Yeh Jhijhakne Yeh Thitakne Ki Ada ...]										
 "Tik Tik Tik Mera Dil Bole Tune Tune Ho Sanam (Duet Lata Mangeshkar - Laxmikant-Pyarelal/Anand Bakshi) - Humjoli 1970"      [Aa Ha Ha Aa Ha Ha ...]										
 "Tin Kanashtar Peet Peet Kar gala Fadkar Chillana, YAar Mere Mat Bura Na MAan Yeh Gana Hain Na Bajana (Eastern/Western - Shankar-Jaikishan) - Love Marriage 1959"      [Aa Aa Aa ...]										
 "Tin Kanashtar Pit Pit Kar Gala Phad Kar Chillana Yaar Mere Mat Bura Maan Yeh Gana Hain Na Bajana Hain (Twist Solo - Shankar-Jaikishan/Shailendra) - Love Marriage 1959"      [Aa Aa Aa Aa Aa Aa ...]										
 "Tip Tip Toe Mere Dil Hain Do (Duet Geeta Dutt - N. Dutta aka Datta Naik/Jan Nisar Akhtar) - Mr. John 1959"										
 "Tir Pe Tir Khaye Ja, Julmo Sitam Uthaye Ja, Aey Mere Beqaraar Dil, Geet Wafa Ke Gaye Ja (Solo - Sajjad Hussain) - Rooplekha 1949"										
 "Tirchi Nazar Se Yun Na Dekh, (Cat Meow) Palat Palat Ke Yun Na Dekh, (Cat Meow) Mar Jaaye Rahon Mein Dilwale, Tirchhi Nazar Se Tu Na Dekh, Tirchi Nazar Se Yun Na Dekh, (Cat Meow) Palat Palat Ke Yun Na Dekh, (Cat Meow) Mar Jaaye Rahon Mein Dilwale, Aisi Nazr Se Tu Na Dekh (Swing Solo - Shankar-Jaikishan/hasrat Jaipuri) - Ek Phool Chaar Kaante 1960"										
 "To Se Laage Naina Saiyan  (Duet Asha Bhosle - Ravi/Shailendra) - Nai Raahein 1959"										
 "Tod Diya Chashma Mera (Duet Asha Bhosle - Ravi/Qamar Jalalabadi) - Modern Girl 1961"										
 "Tod Do Ahd E Mohabbat (Urdu Ghazal Solo - Maqbool Iqbal Hussain/Aish Kanwal) - Rafi Aye Jaan E Ghazal ****"										
 "Todo Dil Ke Tar (Solo - Firoz Nizami/Ishwar Chandra Kapoor) - Amar Raj 1946"										
 "Tohi Mori Lagan Lagaye Re (Non-Filmy Solo - Unknown/Unknown) - Tere Bharose Nandlal 1991"										
 "Tomaader Aashirbaadey (Begali Solo - Basu Manohari/Mukul Dutt) - Rafi ****" 										
 "Tomar Haather Sonar Rakhee By Kazi Nazrul Islam (Bangali - Unknown) - Aajo Madhuro Banshori Baaje 1981 or 2011"										
 "Toot Gaya Haaye Toot Gaya, Toot Gaya Haaye Toot Gaya (Waltz Style Multi Rajkumari and Shamshad Begum - Sajjad Hussain-Bulo C. Rani-Ram Panjwani/Mullaji) - Magroor 1950"										
 "Toot Gaye Sab Saath Saharein (Solo - Chitragupt/Shyam Hindi) - Raj Darbar 1955"										
 "Toote Huye Dil Ko Ulfat Ka, Bas Itna Fasana Yaad Raha, Ik Unka Aana Yaad Raha Ik Unka Jaana Yaad Raha (Solo - Husnlal-Bhagatram/Qamar Jalalabadi) - Hamari Manzil 1949"										
 "Toote huye Dil Se Mere Aawaz (Solo - Husnlal-Bhagatram/Qamar Jalalabadi) - Gauna 1950"										
 "Toote Huye Khwabon Ne (Solo - Salil Chowdhary/Shailendra) - Madhumati 1958 and Mohammed Rafi Collection Vol. 2 and 8 ****"										
 "Toote To Toote Koi Dil Ka Sahara (Duet Asha Bhosle - Laxmikant-Pyarelal/Anand Bakshi) - Lagan 1971"										
 "Tora Dekhe Ja Amina By Kazi Nazrul Islam (Bengali - Unknown) - Aajo Madhuro Banshori Baaje 1981 or 2011"										
 "Tu Aap Hain Apna Chor, Kaahe Rapat Kare Kotwali, Tu Aap Hain Apna Chor, Kaahe Rapat Kare Kotwali (Solo - Chitragupt/Rajendra Krishan) - Patang 1960"										
 "Tu Aas Ka Deepak Jala (Solo - Chitragupt/Bharat Vyas) - Jai Mahalaxmi Maa 1976"										
 "Tu Akela Nahin (Solo - J. P. Kaushik/Naqsh Lyallpuri) - Sister 1980"										
 "Tu Baghon Ki Morni Main Panchhi Albela (Solo - C. Ramchandra/Rajendra Krishan) - Insaniyat 1955" 										
 "Tu Bande Kya Jaane (Solo Prayer - S. Madan/Kashmir Kadar) - Ambe Maa Jagdambe Maa 1980"										
 "Tu Bandia Ki Jane Mata De Chamatkara Nu (Punjabi Solo Prayer - S. Madan/Kashmir Kader) - Mittar Pyare Nu **** and Mata Diya Bhetan Vol. 1 **** and Jai Mata Sherawali 1977"										
 "Tu Been Baja Sajna (Duet Asha Bhosle - Sonik-Omi/Verma Malik) - Khoon Ki Takkar 1981"										
 "Tu Bemissal Hai Teri Tarif Kya Karoon Aankhon Se Pee Raha Hoon (Piano - Shankar-Jaikishan) - Brahmachari 1967"										
 "Tu Bhi Aaa Jaa Ke Aa Gayi Rut Mastaani O Dhol Sajna Dhol Jani Meri Gali Aa Teri Meharbani (Duet Lata Mangeshkar - Kalyanji-Anandji/Anand Bakshi) - Maryada 1971"										
 "Tu Bhi Reh Main Bhi (Duet Shamshad Begum - Prakash Nath Sharma/Avtar Visharad) - Ek Kadam 1947"										
 "Tu Bigdi Garib Ki Bana De Prabhuji 1 (Prayer Asha Bhosle - O. P. Nayyar/Qamar Jalalabadi) - Phagun 1958"      [Bana De Bana De Bana De Prabhuji ...] 										
 "Tu Chali Aa Chali Aa Meri Mehbooba (Duet Asha Bhosle - Laxmikant-Pyarelal/Anand Bakshi) - Kali Ghata 1979"										
 "Tu Chanda Main Chandni (Duet Lata Mangeshkar - Husnlal-Bhagatram/Ramesh Gupta, Gulshan Jalalabadi and Qamar Jalalabadi) - Raja Harishchandra 1952"										
 "Tu Dil Mera Lauta De Angrezi Saheebjaade Meri Tauba (Duet Geeta Dutt - O. P. Nayyar/Jan Nisar Akhtar) - Mai Baap 1957"										
 "Tu Ek Bulbula Pani Ka (Multi Lata Mangeshkar and Geeta Roy - Husnlal-Bhagatram) - Naach 1949"      [Tu Karta Maan Jawani Ka ...]										
 "Tu Gaddar Sahi Tu Makkar Sahi ( Solo - Laxmikant-Pyarelal/Anand Bakshi) - Gaddar 1973"										
 "Tu Hain Kahaan (Solo - Kalyanji-Anandji/Naqsh Lyallpuri) - Log Kya Kahenge 1982"										
 "Tu Hain Ki Nahin Hain Mujhe Bhagwan Bata De (Solo - Shri Nath Tripathi/Raja Mehdi Ali Khan) - Inaam 1955"										
 "Tu Hain Mera Prem Devta (Duet Manna Dey - O. P. Nayyar/Qamar Jalalabadi) - Kalpana 1960"										
 "Tu Hain Ya Nahin Bhagwan, Kabhi Hota Bharonsa, Kbhi Hota Bharm, Pada ulzan Mein Hain Insaan, Mat Ulzan Mein Pad Insaan (Prayer Manna Dey and Lata Mangeshkar - Shri Nath Tripathi/Bharat Vyas) - Janam Janam Ke Phere 1957"										
 "Tu Hi Faqir Tu Hi Hain Raja (Duet Usha Mangeshkar - Pandurang Dikshit/Manoj Kumar) - Shirdi Ke Saibaba 1977"										
 "Tu Hi Meri Laxmi Tuhi Meri Chhaya Duniya Mein Aaya To Teri Khatir Aaya O Laxmi Chhaya (Twist Solo - Shankar-Jaikishan/Hasrat Jaipuri) - Duniya 1968"										
 "Tu Hi Woh Haseen (Solo - Ravindra Jain/Ravindra Jain) - Khwaab 1980"										
 "Tu Hindu Banega Na Musalman Insaan Ki Aulad Hai Insaan Banega (Patriotic Solo - N. Dutta aka Datta Naik/Sahir Ludhianvi) - Dhool Ka Phool 1959 and Mohammed Rafi Collection Vol. 4 *****"										
 "Tu Hoke Bada Ban Jaana Apni Mata Ka Rakhwala (Solo - Ravi) - Khandan 1965"      [Main Sunata Hoon Tujhe ...]										
 "Tu Husn Hain, Tu Jawani Hain, Ik Aag Hain, Ik Pani Hain, Dono Ki Yeh Kahani Hain (Qawali Type - Laxmikant-Pyarelal/Anand Bakshi) - Yuvraaj 1979"      [O O O O O Aa Aa Aa ...]										
 "Tu Is Tarah Se Mere Zindagi Main (Solo - Usha Khanna/Nida Fazil)- Aap To Aise Na The 1980"										
 "Tu Itna Samajh Le Sanam, Tu Itna Samajh Le Sanam, Koi Rakhwala Hoon Main Tera, Teri Chahat Ki Mujh Ko Kasam Koi Matwala Hoon Main Tera (Solo - Kalyanji-Anandji/Rajendra Krishan) - Rakhwala 1971"										
 "Tu Jane Ya Na Jane Tum Jaoge Jahan (Duet Manna Dey - Kalyanji-Anandji/Qamar Jalalabadi) - Johar Mehmood In Hong Kong 1971"										
 "Tu Jo Kahein (Multi S. Balbir and Geeta Dutt - Chitragupt/Prem Dhawan) - Baazigar 1959"										
 "Tu Jo Likhe Kismat Aisi (Solo - Vinod/Kaif Irfani) - Laadla 1954"										
 "Tu Jo Nahin Koi Mera ..Zindagi Meri Yaadon Mein Khoyi Nahin (Solo - Kalyanji-Anandji/Indeevar) - Darinda 1977"										
 "Tu Jungal Ki Morni, Te Main Bagaana Mor, Ke Loop Chhoop Chori Chori, Aaha Ke Loop Chhoop Chori Chori, Chori Chori Loop Chhoop Aado Baata Karlaiye, Baata Karlaiye Mulaqaata Karlaiye, Mera Naam Hain Chandni Te Tera Naam Chakor Ke Loop Chhoop Chori Chori, Aaha Ke Loop Chhoop Chori Chori, Chori Chori Loop Chhoop Aado Baata Karlaiye (Duet Suman Kalyanpur - Kalyanji Aanandji/Anand Bakshi) - Raja Saab 1969" 										
 "Tu Kaala Main Gori, Balam Tori Mori Bhala Ab Kaisi Jamegi (Duet Asha Bhosle - N. Dutta aka Datta Naik/Sahir Ludhianvi) - Light House 1958"										
 "Tu Kahaan Hain Balam Mere Aa Ja (Duet Parol Ghosh aka Paro Devi  - Mohammed Shafi/Behzad Lakhnavi) - Gharana 1949"										
 "Tu Kahaan, Tu Kahaan Ye Bata Is Nashilee Raat Mein Mane Na Mera Dil Diwana Haaye Re Mane Na Mera Dil Diwana O O O (Solo - S. D. Burman/Hasrat Jaipuri) - Tere Ghar Ke Samne 1963"										
 "Tu Kahin Aas Paas Hain Dost (Solo - Laxmikant Pyarelal/Anand Bakshi) - Aas Paas 1980 and Down Memory Lane -Mohammad Rafi ****"										
 "Tu Ladki, Main Ladka, Ladka, Tu Ladki Main Ladka (Duet Asha Bhosle - O. P. Nayyar/Qamar Jalalabadi) - Do Ustad 1959"  (Rafi Sings for Raj Kapoor)									
 "Tu Le Le Allah Naam, Tu Le Le Maula Naam, Tere Ban Jaaye Bigde Kaam, Tu Le Le Allah Naam, Tu Le Le Maula Naam (Prayer Solo - Allah Rakha Qureshi/Asad Bhopali) - Alladin II Laila 1957"      [Le Le Allah Ka Naam-O-Bande, Le Le Maula Naam,  Le Le Allah Ka Naam-O-Bande, Le Le Maula Naam ...]										
 "Tu Malik E Nijoom Hain (Prayer Solo - Suresh Kumar/Anjaan-Yogesh Gaud) - Lutera Aur Jadugar 1968"      (May Be Unreleased)										
 "Tu Mera Copy-Right Main Tera Copy-Right (Duet Lata Mangeshkar - Shankar-Jaikishan/Shailendra) - Shararat 1959"      [Mister Sister ...]    (Rare Because Rafi Sings for Kishore Kumar As An Actor)										
 "Tu Mera Main Teri Duniya Jale To Jale Na Na Na Na Dil Tera Jaan Teri Duniya Jale To Jale (Twist Duet Asha Bhosle - Shankar-Jaikishan/Hasrat Jaipuri) - Pyar Hi Pyar 1969"										
 "Tu Mera Ranjha Main Teri Heer (Duet Meenu Purushottam - Surender Kohli/Mahendra Dehlvi) - Qasam 1976"										
 "Tu Mere Samne Hain Teri Zulfein Hain Khuli Tera Aanchal Hain Dhala Main Hosh Mein Kaise Rahoon Tu Mere Samne Hain (Beauty Solo - Madan Mohan Kohli/Hasrat Jaipuri) - Suhagan 1964"										
 "Tu Mere Sapano Ki Rani Banegi (Waltz Solo - Laxmikant-Pyarelal/Anand Bakshi) - Gora Aur Kala 1972"      [Ik Na Ik Din Yeh Kahani Banegi ...]										
 "Tu Meri Heroine Main Tera Hero (Duet Shamshad Begum - Chitragupt/Manohar Khanna) - Zindagi Ke Mele 1956"										
 "Tu Mujhe Tham Le Ke Main Gir Na Jaaoon Gir na Jaaoon (Solo - Laxmikant-Pyarelal/Anand Bakshi) - Suraj Aur Chanda 1973"										
 "Tu Ne Jo Idhar Dekha Maine Bhi Udhar Dekh (Qawali Duet Geeta Dutt - Vasant Desai/Majrooh Sultanpuri) - Ardhangini 1959"      [Are ...]										
 "Tu Ne Le Liya Hain Dil (Duet Geeta Dutt - S. D. Burman/Shailendra) - Miya Bibi Razi 1960"										
 "Tu Ne Maar Dala, Mujhe Tu Ne Maar Dala, Tere Dekh Dekh Sad Ke, Hua Dil Mein Ik Ujala, Tere Dekh Dekh Sad Ke, Mujhe Tu Ne Maar Dala, Mujhe Tu Ne Maar Dala, Tere Dekh Dekh Sad Ke (Solo - Shankar-Jaikishan/Hasrat Jaipuri) - Naina 1973"   [Nazar Jab Uthai Dua Ban Gayi, Nazar Jab Jhukai Aada Ban Gayi, Nazar Jab Milai Wafa Ban Gayi, Nazar Jab Churai Ada Ban Gayi, ..Priya ..Anuradha ...Mujhe ...]										
 "Tu Ne Maar Ke Pyar Ki Bomb Tu Ne Mere Dil Ko Kar Diya Mom, Ab Hari Om Ab Hari Om, Ab Hari Om Ab Hari Om, Aa Aa Ha Ha.. (Solo - O. P. Nayyar/Hasrat Jaipuri) - Mr. Qartoon M. A."    [Aa Aa Aa ..Masjid Dekhi, Mandir Dekhe, Dekhe Girja Sare Pyar Na Mujh Ko Kahin Mila To Aaya Tere Dwaare, ...]										
 "Tu Ne Mera Yaar Na Milaya, Main Kya Janu Teri Yeh Khudai, O O O Tu Ne Mera Yaar Na Milaya, Main Kya Janu Teri Yeh Khudai, O O O Tu Ne Mera Yaar, Tu Ne Mera Yaar, Tu Ne Mera Yaar Na Milaya, Main Kya Janu Teri Yeh Khudai (Solo - Husnlal-Bhagatram/Majrooh Sultanpuri) - Shama Parwana 1954"    [Teri Khudrat Teri Tazveer Mujhe Kya Maloom, Banti Hogi Kahin Taqdeer Mujhe Kya Maloom, O ...]										
 "Tu Ne Mujhe Bulaya Shera Waliye (Duet Narendra Chanchal -Laxmikant Pyarelal/Anand Bakshi) - Aasha II 1980"										
 "Tu Ne Muskura Ke Dekha (Duet Krishna Kalle - Shri Nath Tripathi/B. D. Mishra) - Shankar Khan 1966"										
 "Tu Ne Teri Nazar Ne To Kafir Bana Diya (Duet Mubarak Begum - Snehal Bhatkar/Kedar Sharma) - Fariyad 1964"										
 "Tu Ping Te Main Parchawan (Punjabi Duet Asha Bhosle - Sardul Kwatra/Chand Pandit) - 50 Glorious Years Of Punjabi Music Vol. 1 ****"										
 "Tu Prem Nagar Ka Saadhu (Duet Sabita Bannerjee - Robin Banerjee/Raja Mehdi Ali Khan) - Masoom 1960"										
 "Tu Raat Khadi (Duet Usha Timothy - Kalyanji Anandji/Anand Bakshi) - Himalay Ki God Mein 1965"										
 "Tu Shokh Kali Main Mast Pawan (Duet Asha Bhosle - Lachhiram Tamar/Kaifi Azmi) - Main Suhagan Hoon 1964"										
 "Tu Yun Aasmaan Pe Khada Muskuraye (Duet Surinder Kaur - Ustad Alla Rakha Qureshi) - Sabak 1950"      [Dil Mein Kabhi, Dil Ka Dard Chhup Jata To Daag Chand ke Dil Ka Nazar Nahin Aata Ho Ho O ...]										
 "Tu Yun Aasman Pe Khada Muskuraye, Tu Yun Aasman Pe Khada Muskuraye, Ke Jaise Kabhi Lab Pe Nikali Na Haaye, ..Ke Jaise Kabhi Lab Pe Nikali Na Haaye, Tu Yun Aasman Pe Khada Muskuraye, Tu Yun Aasman Pe Khada Muskuraye (Duet Surindar Kaur - A. R. Qureshi/Deena Nath Madhok) - Sabak 1950"      [Agar Hansi Mein Kabhi Dil Ka Dard Chhup Jaata, To Daag Chaand Ke Dil Ka Nazar Nahin Aata O O O Ho O   ...]										
 "Tu Zara Si Baat Pe Khafa Na Ho, Tu Mera Dilruba, Main Teri Dilruba (Swing Duet Suraiya - O. P. Nayyar/Harsh) - Mr. Lambu 1956"										
 "Tujh Ko Dekh Ke Nasha Chha Gaya (Swing Duet Kamal Barot - Sardul Kwatra/Bismil Ludhianvi) - Kala Chashma 1962"										
 "Tujh Ko Main Jan Gayi Maan Ya Na Maan Wayi Wayi (Duet Lata Mangeshkar - Chitragupt/Prem Dhawan) - Zabak 1961"										
 "Tujh Ko Na Koi Gham Mujh Ko (Duet Asha Bhosle - O. P. Nayyar/Jan Nisar Akhtar) - Duniya Rang Rangeeli 1957"										
 "Tujh Ko Pukare Mera Pyar O O O Aaja Main To Mita Hoon Teri Chah Mein (Solo - Ravi/Sahir Ludhianvi) - Neel Kamal 1968 and Mohammed Rafi Collection Vol. 1 ****"      [Aa Aaja Aaja Aaja Aa Aaja Aaja Aaja ...]										
 "Tujh Mein Main Hoon Mujh Mein Tu Hain (Duet Asha Bhosle - Shankar-Jaikishan/Shamshul Huda Bihari) - Rivaaj 1972"										
 "Tujhe Apni Mujhe Apni Padi Hain (Duet Sudha Malhotra - Shivram Krishna/Asad Bhopali) - Rangeela Raja 1960"										
 "Tujhe Dekha Tujhe Chaha Tujehe Pooja Maine Bas Itni Khata Meri Aur Khata Kya (Duet Suman Kalyanpur - Shankar-Jaikishan/Hasrat Jaipuri) - Chhoti Si Mulaqat 1967" 										
 "Tujhe Har Janam Mein Payenge, Bas Yehin Dua Karenege, Yeh Wada Aa Aa Aa Bhool Na Jana, Yeh Wada Aa Aa Aa Bhool Na Jana (Duet Lata Mangeshkar - Laxmikant-Pyarelal/Maya Govind) - Jalte Badan 1973"      [Wada Aa Aa Aa Bhool Na Jana, Wada Aa Aa Aa Bhool Na Jana, O Janewale Laut Ke Aana, Wada Aa Aa Aa Bhool Na Jana, O Janewale Laut Ke Aana, Wada Aa Aa Aa Bhool Na Jana, ..Tere Saath Hi Jiyenge, Tere Saath Hi Marenge, ...]										
 "Tujhe Jaan E Wafa Keh Doon (Solo - Datta Naik/Shakir Kotwi) - Phanda 1975"										
 "Tujhe Jeevan Ki Dor Se Bandh Liya Hai Tere Julm-O-Sitam Sar Aankhon Par (Duet Lata Mangeshkar - Shankar-Jaikishan/Hasrat Jaipuri) - Asli Naqli I 1962"										
 "Tujhe Kya Sunaoon Mein Dilruba Tere Saamane Mera Haal Hai (Solo - Madan Mohan Kohli/Majrooh Sultanpuri) - Aakhri Dao 1958"										
 "Tujhe Pyar Karte Hain, Karte Rehenge, Ke Dil Ban Ke Dil Main, Dhadkate Rehenge (Duet Suman Kalyanpur - Shankar-Jaikishan/Hasrat Jaipuri) - April Fool 1964"										
 "Tujhe To ShivShankar Mil Gaye (Solo - - Chitragupt/Gopal Singh Nepali) - Shiv Bhakt 1955"										
 "Tukade Hain Mere Dil Ke Aye Yaar Tere Aansoo Dekhe Nahin Jaate Hain DilDaar Tere Aansoo  (Solo - O. P. Nayyar/Majrooh Sultanpuri) - Mere Sanam 1965"										
 "Tum Aankh-Michauli Khel Rahe (Solo - Chitragupt/Gopal Singh Nepali) - Shri Krishna Bhakti 1955"										
 "Tum Aise Basey Morey Nain (Solo - Ganesh/Majrooh Sultanpuri) - Saa Re Gaa Maa Paa 1972"										
 "Tum Akele To Kabhi Baag Mein Jaaya Na Karo, Tum Akele To Kabhi Baag Mein Jaaya Na Karo, Aaj Kal Phool Bhi Diwale Hua Karte Hain, Koi Kadmon Se Lipat Baitha To Phir, To Phir Kya Hoga, To Phir Kya Hoga, Tum Akele To Kabhi Baag Mein Jaaya Na Karo, Tum Akele To Kabhi Baag Mein Jaaya Na Karo, Aaj Kal Kaliyaan Badi Shokh Hua Karti Hain, Koi Shokhi Pe Utar Aaye To Phir, To Phir Kya Hoga, To Phir Kya Hoga, Tum Akele To Kabhi Baag Mein Jaaya Na Karo (Duet Lata Mangeshkar - Usha Khanna/Rajendra Krishan) - Aao Pyar Karen I 1964"										
 "Tum Apne Dil Ki Haalat Hum Se Poochchho (Duet Master Sonik - Hansraj Behl/Asad Bhopali-Naqsh Lyallpuri) - Mast Kalandar 1955"										
 "Tum Apni Saheli Ko (Duet Asha Bhosle - Ravi/Sahir Ludhianvi) - Samaaj Ko Badal Dalo 1970"										
 "Tum Bhi Jawaan Aur Hum Bhi Jawaan (Funny Asha Bhosle - Ravi/Prem Dhawan) - Dus Lakh 1966"      [Teri Patli Kamar Teri Bali Umar Teri Baankhi Ada Mein Hum Bhi Kurbaan Are ...]										
 "Tum Bin Jaoon Kahan, Tum Bin Jaoon Kahan, Ke Duniya Mein Aa Ke, Kuchh Na Phir, Chaha Sanam, Tum Ko Chah Ke, Tum Bin 1 (Solo - R. D. Burman/Majrooh Sultanpuri) - Pyar Ka Mausam 1969 and Mohammed Rafi Collection Vol. 1 and 9 ****"										
 "Tum Bin Jaoon Kahan, Tum Bin Jaoon Kahan, Ke Duniya Mein Aa Ke, Kuchh Na Phir, Chaha Sanam, Tum Ko Chah Ke, Tum Bin 2 (Solo - R. D. Burman/Majrooh Sultanpuri) - Pyar Ka Mausam 1969"										
 "Tum Bin Sajan, Barse Nayan, Jab Jab Badal Barase, Majboor Hum Majboor Tum, Dil Milne Ko Tarase (Duet Lata Mangeshkar - Shankar-Jaikishan/Shailendra) - Gaban 1966"										
 "Tum Chali Jaogi Parchhayiyan Reh Jayegi (Solo - Khayyam/Sahir Ludhianvi) - Shagoon 1964"										
 "Tum Chhupe Huye Ho (Solo - Shri Nath Tripathi/Prem Dhawan) - Shiv Parvati 1962"										
 "Tum Dilli, Main Agre Mein, Mere Dil Se Nikale Haaye, Fasla, Fasla Sau Kauns Ka, Ab Yeh Sawan Beet Na Jaye, Tum Bhi Sachche Hum Bhi Sachche, ..Meri Maa Meri Maa Yeh Na Samajhe ..(Duet Shyam Ji - Naushad Ali/Deena Nath Madhok) - Pahele Aap 1944"      (First Released Hindi Film Songs)     										
 "Tum Ek Baar Mohabbat Ka Imtihan To Lo (Solo - Roshan Lal/Sahir Ludhianvi)- Baabar 1960"										
 "Tum Hanse To Gham Sharmaya (Duet Shamshad Begum - Mohan Junior/Kaif Irfani) - Dana Pani 1953"										
 "Tum Hi Ne Dard Diya Hain, Tum Hi Dawa Dena, 2 (Solo - O. P. Nayyar/Jaan Nisar Akhtar) - Chhoo Mantar 1956"     										
 "Tum Hi Ne Dard Diya, Tum Hi Ne Dard Diya Hain, Tum Hi Dawa Dena, Gareeb Jaan Ke 1 (Waltz Geeta Dutt - O. P. Nayyar/Jaan Nisar Akhtar) - Chhoo Mantar 1956"      [Gareeb Jaan Ke, Gareeb Jaan Ke, Hum Ko Na Tum Mita Dena ...]										
 "Tum Hi Ne Dil Mera Chheen Ke, Mujh Ko Rula Diya, Tumhi Ne Dil Mera Chheen Ke, Mujh Ko Rula Diya, Jhoote Balam Bhole Sanam Maine Tujhe Pehchan Liya, Haaye Tumhi Ne Dil Mera Chheen Ke, Mujh Ko Rula Diya (Duet Suman Kalyanpur - Sardul Kwatra/Anand Bakshi) - Air Mail II 1960"										
 "Tum Hi Se Huyi Hain Shuru (Solo - Laxmikant-Pyarelal/Anand Bakshi) - Mera Dost 1969"										
 "Tum Hi Tum Ho Mere Jeevan Mein, Phool Hi Phool Hain Jaise Chaman Mein, Tu-m Hi Tum Ho Mere Jeevan Mein, Phool Hi Phool Hain Jaise Chaman Mein, Ek Ho Mere Tum Iss Jahaan Mein, Ek Hain Chanda Jaise Gagan Mein, Ek Ho Mere Tum Iss Jahaan Mein, Ek Hain Chanda Jaise Gagan Mein, Tum Hi Tum Ho, Tum Hi Tum Ho (Waltz Lata Mangeshkar - Shankar-Jaikishan/Shailendra) - Ek Dil Sau Afsane 1963"  (Rafi Sings for Raj Kapoor)										
 "Tum Ho Haseen Kahaan Ke Hum Chaand Aasmaan Ke Haaye Haaye Gurur Itna Haan Haan Huzur Itna Oop Yeh Ada Yeh Nasha Haan Haan Haan (Duet Asha Bhosle - Madan Mohan Kohli/Rajendra Krishan) - Sharabi 1964"      [Ae Hey Hey Hey Aa Ha Ha Ha Ha O Ho O Lu La La La ...]										
 "Tum Ho Haseen Kahaan Ke, ..Hum Chaand Aasman Ke, ..Haay Haay Guroor Itna, ..Haan Haan Huzoor Itna, ..Uff Yeh Ada, Haaye Yeh Nasha, ..Ha Ha Ha (Duet Asha Bhosle - Madan Mohan Kohli/Rajendra Krishan) - Sharabi 1964"     [Hey Hey Hey Aa Ha Ha Ha Ho Ho Ho Lu La La La ...]										
 "Tum Ho Jaao Humarein Kabhi Chaandni Raaton Mein (Duet Surinder Kaur - Khan Mastana-Nisar Bazmi/Khumar BaraBankvi) - Roop Lekha 1949"										
 "Tum Humein Bhool Gaye Hum Na Tumhein Bhoola Sake (Solo - Husnlal-Bhagatram/Qamar Jalalabadi) - Balam 1949"										
 "Tum Ishq Ki Mehfil Ho,Tum Husn Ka Jalwa Ho, Yaa Saaje Mohabbat Par Chheda Hua Nagama Ho, Ek Baar Phir Kaho Zara, Shayir Ho Musveer Ho Maloom Nahin Kya Ho, Lagata  Hai Mujhe Aisa Tum Meri Tammana Ho, ..Ek Baar Phir Kaho Zara (Duet Asha Bhosle - Naushad Ali/Khumar Barabankvi) - Saaz Aur Awaz 1966"      [Hun Hun Hun ...Aa Aa Aa ...]										
 "Tum Jaane Ya Hum Jaane (Duet Asha Bhosle - Kalyanji-Anandji/Ravindra Jain) - Kalicharan 1976"										
 "Tum Jahan Jaoge Mujh Ko Bhi Wahin Paoge Bas Ke Ab Meri Nigahon Se Kahan Jaoge, Tum Jahan Jaoge Mujh Ko Bhi Wahin Paoge Bas Ke Ab Meri Nigahon se Kahan Jaoge, Tum Jahan Jaoge (Solo - Frank/Kaifi Azar) - Chor Darwaza 1965"      [Hun Hun Hun ...] 										
 "Tum Jano, Tum Jano Ya Hum Janein, Ye Tum Jano, Tum Jano Ya Hum Jane (Janmashthami Prayer Asha Bhosle - Kalyanji-Anandji/Ravindra Jain) - KaliCharan 1975"      [Hey Hey Hey Hey ..Are Baar Baar, O Baar Baar Tum Ko Hum Sab Ka Pranam, Hum Sab Ka Pranam, O Baar Baar Tum Ko Hum Sab Ka Pranam, Tum Kitne Bade Ho, Haan Kitne Mahaan, Haan Haan Kitne Mahaan, Yeh Log Bhala Kya Pehchane, ...]      										
 "Tum Jaoge Jahaan Hum Ko Paoge Wahan  (Duet Manna Dey - Kalaynji Anandji) - Johar Mahmood In Hong Kong 1971"      [Hum To Tere Hain Diwane Tu Jaane Ya Na Jaane ...]										
 "Tum Jis Pe Nazar Dalo Us Dil Ka Khuda Hafiz Katil Bhi Khuda Jane (Solo - Ravi/Rajendra Krishan) - Yeh Raaste Hai Pyar Ke 1963"    [O O O O O O ...] 										
 "Tum Jo Ho So Ho (Duet Manna Dey - Chitragupt/Prem Dhawan) - Biradari 1966"										
 "Tum Jo Hoo Way Mere Hum-Safar Ruste Badal Gaye, Lakho Diye Mere Pyar Ki Raahon Mein Jal Gaye (Waltz Duet Geeta Dutt - O. P. Nayyar/Majrooh Sultanpuri) - 12 O'Clock 1957"										
 "Tum Jo Mil Gaye Ho To Yeh Lagta Hain Ke Jahan Mil Gaya Ek Bhatke Huye Rahi Ko Carvaan Mil Gaya (Duet Lata Mangeshkar - Madan Mohan Kohli/Kaifi Azmi) - Hanste Zakhm 1973 and Mohammed Rafi Collectionn Vol. 7 ****"										
 "Tum Kalpana Karo 2 (Solo - C. Ramchandra/Magan) - Bachchon Ka Khel 1946"										
 "Tum Kamsin Ho Nadaan Ho Nazuk Ho Bholi Ho Sochta Hoon Main Tumhe Pyar Na Karoon (Solo - Shankar-Jaikishan/Hasrat Jaipuri) - Ayee Milan Ki Bela 1964"										
 "Tum Kaun? ..Mamul, Jo Puchhoonga Batalaoge, Bataloonga (Duet UNknown Monkey Khel - Ravi/Shakeel Badayuni) - Phool Aur Patthar 1966" 										
 "Tum Ko Dekha To (Duet Asha Bhosle - Laxmikant Pyarelal/Sahir Ludhianvi) - Deedar-E-Yaar 1982"										
 "Tum Ko Dil De Baithe (Duet Meena Kapoor - Bullo C. Rani/Deena Nath Madhok) - Aabroo II 1956"										
 "Tum Ko Jyon Hi Mere Naina Choomein, Masti Mein Jhoomein Yeh Dharti Woh Aasmaan Sara Yeh Sara Jahaan Aa Aa Aa (Duet Asha Bhosle - N. Dutta aka Datta Naik/Shri Ram Saaz) - Return Of Johnny 1972"										
 "Tum Ko Khush Dekh Kar Main Bahot Khush Hua, Yeh Aankh Bhar Aayi To Kya Hua (Friendship Duet Kishore Kumar - Rajesh Roshan/Anand Bakshi) - Aap Ke Deewane 1980"										
 "Tum Ko Salaam Hain (Duet Lata Mangeshkar - Laxmikant-Pyarelal/Anand Bakshi) - Aasha II 1980"										
 "Tum Laakh Chhupana Chahoge, Par Pyar Chhupana Na Paoge, Kachche Dhaangese Bandhe, Sarkar Chale Aaoge, Sarkar Chale Aaoge, (Claps) ..Tum Laakh Chhupana Chahoge, Par Pyar Chhupana Na Paoge, Dil Ko Thame Haathonse, Khamosh Chale Jaoge, Khamosh Chale Jaoge, (Claps) ..Tum Laakh Chhupana Chahoge, Par Pyar Chhupana Na Paoge, Kachche Dhaangese Bandhe, Sarkar Chale Aaoge, Sarkar Chale Aaoge (Qawali Style Duet Lata Mangeshkar - Shankar-Jaikishan/Hasrat Jaipuri) - Singapore 196)"										
 "Tum Mahalon Mein Rahenewalein (Solo - Harilal Thakur/Ramesh Gupta) - Chetana 1952"    										
 "Tum Mard Nikaloge Ghoonghat (Duet Suman Kalyanpur - S. Mohinder/Raja Mehdi Ali Khan) - Reporter Raju 1962"										
 "Tum Mere Pyaar Ki Duniya Mein Bansin Ho Jab Se, Tum Mere Pyaar Ki Duniya Mein Bansin Ho Jab Se, Jarre Jarre Mein Mujhe Pyaar Nazar Aata Hain, Meri Har Saans Mein Aati Hain Tumhari Khushboo, Sara Aalam Mujhe Gulzaar Nazar Aata Hain, Tum Mere Pyaar Ki Duniya Mein Bansin Ho Jab Se, Jarre Jarre Mein Mujhe Pyaar Nazar Aata Hain, Meri Har Saans Mein Aati Hain Tumhari Khushboo, Sara Aalam Mujhe Gulzaar Nazar Aata Hain, Tum Mere Pyaar Ki Duniya Mein Bansi Ho Jab Se (Solo - Shankar-Jaikishan/Hasrat Jaipuri) - Bombay Talkies 1971"										
 "Tum Mere Saath Ho (Duet Mehmood - S. D. Burman/Shailendra) - Miya Bibi Razi 1960"										
 "Tum Mere Sapno Mein Aana (Duet Asha Bhosle - Laxmikant-Pyarelal/Anand Bakshi) - Madhavi 1969"										
 "Tum Meri Ho Mere Siwa Kisi Ki Nahin Khati Hoon Kasam, Tum Meri Ho Mere Siwa Kisi Ki Nahin Khati Hoon Kasam 2 (Engagement Duet Lata Mangeshkar - Shankar-Jaikishan/Hasrat Jaipuri) - Aan Baan 1971"										
 "Tum Mile Jo Din Dhale, Peeche Peeche Hum Chale, May I Know Your Name Name Name, Ja Re Jao Mat Chale Peeche Dekho Mat Chale, Chhede Hum Ko Shame Shame Shame [Whistle] Tum Mile Jo Din Dhale, Peeche Peeche Hum Chale, May I Know Your Name Name Name, Ja Re Jao Mat Chale Peeche Dekho Mat Chale, Chhede Hum Ko Shame Shame Shame (Duet Geeta Dutt - N. Datta/Jan Nisar Akhtar) - Doctor (Dr.) Shaitan 1960"										
 "Tum Mile Woh Dil Dhale (Duet Geeta Dutt - N. Dutta aka Datta Naik/Jan Nisar Akhtar) - Doctor (Dr.) Shaitan 1960"										
 "Tum Mujhe Yun, Bhula Na Paoge, Jab Kabhi Bhi, Sunoge Geet Mere, Sang Sang Tum, Bhi Gun-Gunaoge, Haan Tum Mujhe Yun, Bhula Na Paoge (Solo - Shankar-Jaikishan/Hasrat Jaipuri) - Pagla Kahin Ka 1970 and Mohammed Rafi Collection Vol. 1 and 5 ****"										
 "Tum Nahin Yahan Hum Nahin (Qawali Multi Kishore Kumar and Asha Bhosle - Kalyanji-Anandji/Varma Malik) - Karmyogi 1978"      [Aa Aa Aa ...Mehfil Mein Aaj Jhoomake Shabab Aa Gaya, Sitamgar Tere Sitam Ka Jabab Aa Gaya ..Aa Aa Aa ..Humse Aake Aankh Milaye, Ho O O Humse Aake Aankh Milaye, Aankh Milaye, Aankh Milyae To Kya Aankh Milaye, Tujh Mein Itna Dam Nahin, Tujh Mein Itna Dam Nahin O Aaj Faisla Ho Jayega Ho Jayega Ho Jayega Aaj Faisla Ho Jayega ...] 										
 "Tum Ne Kisi Ki Jaan Ko Jaate Hua Dekha Hain Woh Dekho Mujh Se Ruth Kar Meri Jaan Ja Rahi Hain (Solo - Shankar-Jaikishan/Hasrat Jaipuri) - RajKumar 1964"										
 "Tum Ne Mujhe Dekha Ho Kar Meherabaan Ruk Gayi Yeh Zameen Thum Gaya Aasmaan (Solo - R. D. Burman/Majrooh Sultanpuri) - Teesri Manzil 1966 and Mohammed Rafi Collection Vol. 9 ****"										
 "Tum Ne Pukara Aur Hum Chale Aaye, Dil Hatheli Par Le Aaye Re (Duet Suman Kalyanpur - Shankar-Jaikishan/Hasarat Jaipuri) - RajKumar 1964"    [AA Aa Aa ..O O ...]										
 "Tum Pe Hum Qurban Kismat Ban Jayein (Duet Suman Kalyanpur - Jamal Sen/Pandit Indra) - Baghdad 1961"										
 "Tum Pe Nazil Hua Quran 2 (Solo - Shyamji Ghanshyamji/Anjum Jaipuri) - Deen Aur Imaan 1979"										
 "Tum Poochhte Ho Ishq Bala Hain Ke Nahin Hai Kya Jane Tumhe Hote Khuda Hai Ke Nahin Hai (Solo - Bipin Babul/Kaifi Azmi) - Naqli Nawab 1962"      [Hun Hun Hun ...]										
 "Tum Rooth Ke Mat Jana  (Duet Asha Bhosle - O. P. Nayyar/Qamar Jalalabadi) - Phagun 1958"      [Zamin Pe Aaj Sitaron Yeh Shab Nahin Bhari Bahut Udas Bahut Beqaraar Hum Bhi Hain ..O O O O O O ...]										
 "Tum Sa Nahin Dekha O Tumsa Nahin Dekha, Yun To Hum Ne Lakh Haseen Dekhe Hain, Tumsa Nahin Dekha O Tumsa Nahin Dekha (Horse-Cart Solo - O. P. Nayyar/Majrooh Sultanpuri) - Tumsa Nahin Dekha 1957"    [Yun To Hum Ne Lakh Haseen Dekhe Hai ...]										
 "Tum Sab Ko Chhod Kar Aa Jaao (Solo - Shankar-Jaikishan/Hasrat Jaipuri) - Dil Ek Mandir 1963"      [Yahan Koi Nahin Tera ..Mere Siwa Kehti Hain Jhoomati Gaati Hawan ...]										
 "Tum Samne Aa Kar Jis Dum, Jalwa Sa Dikha Jate Ho, Kuchh Tum Ko Khabar Hain Dil Mein, Ik Aag Laga Jate Ho, Tum Haath Pakad Kar Mera, Jab Pyaar Jata Jate Ho, Ik Dard Mita Dete Ho, Ik Dard Badha Jate Ho (Duet Asha Bhosle - Madan Mohan Kohli/Rajendra Krishan) - Khazanchi 1958"       (Note:  This Movie Has a Diwali Song, but not by Rafi)										
 "Tum Samne Baithi Raho Main Geet Gaoon Pyaar Ke, Main Geet Gaoon Pyar Ke (Solo - Unknown) - Unknown ****"      [Mere Liye Do Bas Wahin Pal Hain Haseen Bahaar Ke  ...]  (This Beautiful Song was favorite Song of Begam Bilkis Banu, wife of Mohammed Rafi)										
 "Tum Se Achha Kaun Hain, Dilo Jigar Lo Jaan Lo, Hum Tumhare Hain Sanam, Tum Humein Pehchan Lo (Solo - Shankar-Jaikishan/Hasrat Jaipuri) - Janwar 1965"    [O O O O O O ...]										
 "Tum Se Achha Kaun Hain, Kabhi Hum Ne Nahin Socha Tha, Aisa Din Bhi Aayega, Pani Mein Aaag Lagegi, Patthar Bhi Pighal Jayega, Dekho O O O Tumse Achha Kaun Hain    (Solo - Shankar-Jaikishan/Hasrat Jaipuri) - Tumse Achha Kaun Hai 1969"   [Na-Jaa, Na-Jaa Na-Jaa Na-Jaa Na-Jaa ..Kabhi Hum Ne Nahin Socha Tha, Aisa Din Bhi Aayega, Pani Mein Aaag Lagegi, Patthar Bhi Pighal Jayega ..Dekho O O O  ...]										
 "Tum Se Dil Kya Lagaya (Solo - O. P. Nayyar/Jan Nisar Akhtar) - Duniya Rang Rangeeli 1957"										
 "Tum Se Door RehKe (Duet Lata Mangeshkar - Kalyanji-Anandji/Gulshan Bawra) - Adalat III 1976 and Evergreen Mohd Rafi ****"										
 "Tum Se Izhar E Haal Kar Baithe (Gazal solo - Naushad Ali/Shakeel Badayuni) - Mere Mehboob 1963"      [Aaj Furkat Ka Khwab Tut Gaya Mil Gaye Tum Ijaab Tut Gaya ...]										
 "Tum Se Kahoon Ek Baat Paron Se, Halki Halki, Raat Meri Hain Chhaon Tumhare (Solo - Madan Mohan Kohli/Majrooh Sultanpuri) - Dastak 1970"										
 "Tum Se Lagan Laagi (Duet Lata Mangeshkar - Roshan Lal/Naqsh Lyallpuri) - Madhu 1959"										
 "Tum Se Mano Na Mano Mujhe Tumse Pyar Ho Gaya Hain Tumse Kisi Kam Ke Mujhe Tumse Pyar Ho Gaya Hain (Duet Asha Bhosle - Iqbal Qureshi/Bharat Vyas) - Cha Cha Cha 1964"      [Ha Ha Ha [Laugh] ...]										
 "Tum Se Mila Kar Naina Meri Kismat Soyi (Duet Binapani Mukherjee - Hansraj Behl-Azeez Khan/Mulkraj Bhakti) - Roomal 1949"										
 "Tum Se Nahin Pehchaan Meri Lekin Aise Lagata Hai Pehle Bhi Kisi Yug Mein Apna Saath Raha Ho Jaise (Solo - Rajesh Roshan/Verma Malik) - Ek Hi Raasta 1977"										
 "Tum Se O Haseena Kabhi Mohobbat Na Main Ne Karni Thi, Magar Mere Dil Ne Mujhe Dhokha Diya, O Ha, Magar Mere Dil Ne Mujhe Dhokha Diya, Tum Se O Diwane Kabhi Mohobbat Na Main Ne Karni Thi, Magar Mere Dil Ne Mujhe Dhokha Diya, Magar Mere Dil Ne Mujhe Dhokha Diya (Duet Suman Kalyanpur - Laxmikant-Pyarelal/Anand Bakshi) - Farz 1967"										
 "Tum To Pyar Ho Sajana, Tum To Pyar Ho, Mujhe Tum Se Pyara Aur Na Koi, Tum To Pyar Ho Sajana, Tum To Pyar Ho Sajani, Tum To Pyar Ho, Mujhe Tum Se Pyara Aur Na Koi Tum To Pyar Ho (Duet Lata Mangeshkar - Ramlal/Hasrat Jaipuri) - Sehra 1963"      [AA Aa Aa ...Tum To, ]										
 "Tum Tum Ta Ra Ra Turam ..Chana Jor Garam (Multi Lata Mangeshkar, Kishore Kumar and Nitin Mukesh - Laxmikant-Pyarelal) - Kranti 1980"										
 "Tumaku Parunita Bhuli (Oriya - Shantanu Mahpatra) - Unknown 1967"										
 "Tumharein Bin Guzare Hain Kai Din (Duet Lata Mangeshkar - Shankar-Jaikishan/Vishweshawar Sharma) - Atmaram 1979"										
 "Tumharein Hain Tumse Daya Mangate Hain, Tere Ladlon Ki Dua Maangte Hain (Children Duet Asha Bhosle as Child - Shankar-Jaikishan/Shailendra) - Boot Polish 1954"										
 "Tumharein Husn Se Jagmag Hai Zindagi Apni Kaho Yeh Chand Se Le Jaye Roshani Apni ..Ab Mujhe Chand Sitaron Ki Zaroorat Nahin Mil Gaye Tum To Baharon Ki Zaroorat Rahin (Duet Asha Bhosle - Ravi) - Jogi 1978"										
 "Tumhari Adaon Pe (Duet Asha Bhosle - O. P. Nayyar/Raja Mehdi Ali Khan) - Hongkong 1962"										
 "Tumhari Chaand Si Surat Pe (Duet Asha Bhosle - Lala Asar Sattar/Farooq Qaiser) - Apna Khoon Apna Dushman 1969"										
 "Tumhari Hoon Mere Ho Tum (Duet Asha Bhosle - Shri Nath Tripathi/B. D. Mishra) - Vishnu Puraan 1973"										
 "Tumhari Mulaqat Se Mujh Ko Pata Yeh Chala Ke Mere Bhi Sine Mein Hain Dil Ek Dhadakata Hua (Swing Solo - O. P. Nayyar/Shamshul Huda Bihari) - Mohabbat Zindagi Hai 1966" 										
 "Tumhari Nazar, Kyun Khafa Ho Gayi, Khata Baksh Do, Gar Khata Ho Gayi, Humara Iraada To Kuchh Bhi Na Tha, Tumhari Khata, Khud Saza Ho Gayi 1 (Duet Lata Mangeshkar - Ravi/Sahir Ludhianvi) - Do Kaliyan 1968"										
 "Tumhari Nazar, Kyun Khafa Ho Gayi, Khata Baksh Do, Gar Khata Ho Gayi, Humara Iraada To Kuchh Bhi Na Tha, Tumhari Khata, Khud Saza Ho Gayi 2 (Duet Lata Mangeshkar - Ravi/Sahir Ludhianvi) - Do Kaliyan 1968"										
 "Tumhari Zulf Ke Saayein Mein Shaam Kar Loonga (Solo - Madan Mohan Kohli/Kaifi Azmi) - Naunihal 1967 and Mohammed Rafi Collection Vol. 7 ****"										
 "Tumhein Chupke Se Dil Mein (Duet Asha Bhosle - Vinod/Aziz Kashmiri) - Ek Do Teen 1953"										
 "Tumhein Dekha Hai Maine, Gul-Sitan Mein, Ke Jannat Dhoondh Li Hain, Is Jahaan Mein (Solo - R. D. Burman/Anand Bakshi) - Chandan Ka Palna 1967"										
 "Tumhein Dil Se Chaha, Tumhein Dil Diya Hain, Yeh Wada Karoge, Bhula To Na Doge, Tum Hi Tum Ho Meri, Nigahon Mein Lekin, Nigahon Se Mujh Ko, Gira To Na Doge (Duet Suman Kalyanpur - Salil Chowdhary/Shailendra) - Chand Aur Suraj 1965"										
 "Tumhein Husn De Ke Khuda Ne (Multi Manna Dey, Lata Mangeshkar and Asha Bhosle - N. Dutta aka Datta Naik/Anand Bakshi) - Jab Se Tumhe Dekha Hai 1963"										
 "Tumhein Kaise Kahoon Ho Jee Ho O O O Aate Jaate Na Yun Humein Chheda Karo (Duet Lata Mangeshkar - N. Dutta aka Datta Naik/Sahir Ludhianvi) - Naach Ghar 1959"										
 "Tumhein Main Agar Apna Saathi Bana Loon, Bata Do Mera Saath Doge Kahaan Tak, Zameen Pe Jahaan Aasmaan Mil Raha Hain, Na Chhodenge Daman Tumhara Wanhan Tak (Duet Asha Bhosle - Shankar-Jaikishan/Shamshul Huda Bihari) - Shatranj 1969" 										
 "Tumhein Mohabbat Hain Hum Se Mana Batao Iss Ka Saboot Kya Hain Yeh Haath Seene Pe Rakh Ke Dekho Na Poochho Iss Ka Saboot Kya Hain (Duet Asha Bhosle - O. P. Nayyar/Shewan Rizvi) - Ek Musafir Ek Hasina 1962"										
 "Tumhein Pa Ke Hum Ne Jahan Pa Liya Hain, Zameen To Zameen Aasman Pa Liya Hain (Duet Asha Bhosle - Ravi/Shakeel Badayuni) - Gehra Daag 1963"										
 "Tumhein Sunaye Ek Kahaani (Solo - Husnlal-Bhagatram/Kaif Irfani) - Jal Tarang 1949"										
 "Tumhein Woh Bheegi Hui Raat Yaad Hai 1 (Solo - Laxmikant-Pyarelal/Kaifi Azmi) - Uparwala Jaane 1977"										
 "Tun Aheen Sahibi (Sindhi Solo - Unknown/Unknown) - Mohammed Rafi Sings Sindhi Songs 1991"										
 "Tunak Tunak Tun Bole Jiya (Duet Lata Mangeshkar - Kalyanji-Anandji/Qamar Jalalabadi) - Kahin Pyar Na Ho Jaye 1963"

See also 
 List of songs recorded by Mohammed Rafi
 Recorded songs (A)
 Recorded songs (B-C)
 Recorded songs (D-F)
 Recorded songs (G)
 Recorded songs (H-I)
 Recorded songs (J)
 Recorded songs (K)
 Recorded songs (L)
 Recorded songs (M)
 Recorded songs (N)
 Recorded songs (O)
 Recorded songs (P-R)
 Recorded songs (S)
 Recorded songs (U-Z)

T
Rafi, Mohammed